= Temple of Monthu =

The Temple of Monthu or Montou may refer to several temples dedicated to Monthu:

- Temple of Monthu (Hermonthis)
- Temple of Monthu (Karnak)
- Temple of Monthu (Medamud)
- Temple of Monthu (Tôd)
