= Fernand Bisson de La Roque =

French egyptologist and archaeologist

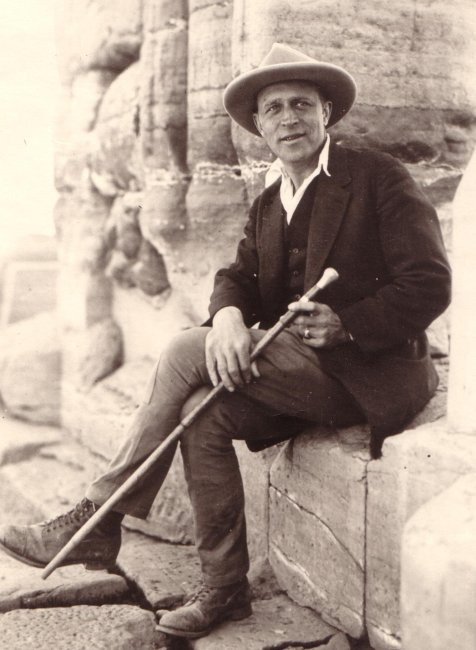
Fernand Bisson de la Roque

Fernand Bisson de La Roque (30 June 1885 in Bourseville (Somme) – 1 May 1958) was a French Egyptologist and archaeologist. His notable excavations include 1921 to 1924 at Djédefrê pyramid at Abu Rawash, 1925 to 1932 at the Temple of Monthu at Medamud, northeast of Thebes and 1933 to 1950 at the Temple of Montu in Tod at Tod (formerly Djerty) southeast of Thebes.

== Publications ==
- Rapport sur les fouilles d'Abou-Roasch, Cairo, Institut français d'archéologie orientale, 1922, 1923, 1924
- With Georges Contenau and Fernand Chapouthier, Le trésor de Tod, Cairo, Institut français d'archéologie orientale, 1953.
