= Ship Sarcophagus =

Roman-era stone coffin found in modern-day Lebanon

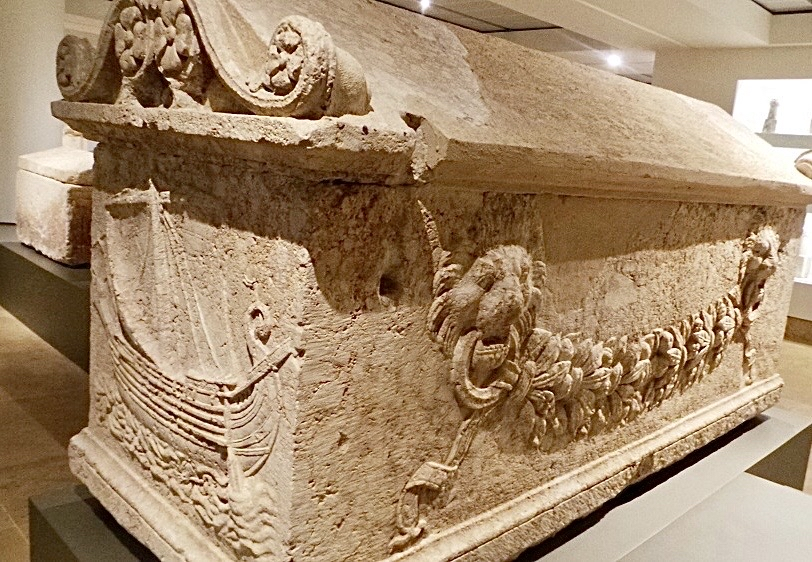
National Museum of Beirut – Ship Sarcophagus 3

The Ship Sarcophagus, also known as the Sarcophagus au Navire, is a Roman era sarcophagus found by Georges Contenau in 1913 in Magharet Abloun, a necropolis containing the remains of Phoenician kings and notables in the south of Sidon in modern-day Lebanon. The sarcophagus has been dated to the 2nd century CE.

It is considered the most important of all the sarcophagi discovered by Contenau in Sidon.

The relief at the head of the sarcophagus represents an ancient ship.

== Bibliography ==
- Editio princeps: Georges Contenau. “Mission archéologique à Sidon (1914). In: Syria. Volume 1, 1920. pp. 16–55. DOI: https://doi.org/10.3406/syria.1920.2837
