= Alexandre Varille =

French egyptologist (1909–1951)

Alexandre Varille (12 March 1909, Lyon – 1 November 1951, Joigny) was a French Egyptologist.

== Life ==
From a cultured family from Lyon, he studied Economics and Letters. During his studies he met Victor Loret, his Egyptology professor at the University of Lyon, and followed him in his devotion to Egyptian philology and archaeology. Varille began working in Egypt in 1931 together with his colleague Clément Robichon (1906-1999), and the following year, he was made a member of the Institut Français d'Archéologie Orientale in Cairo.

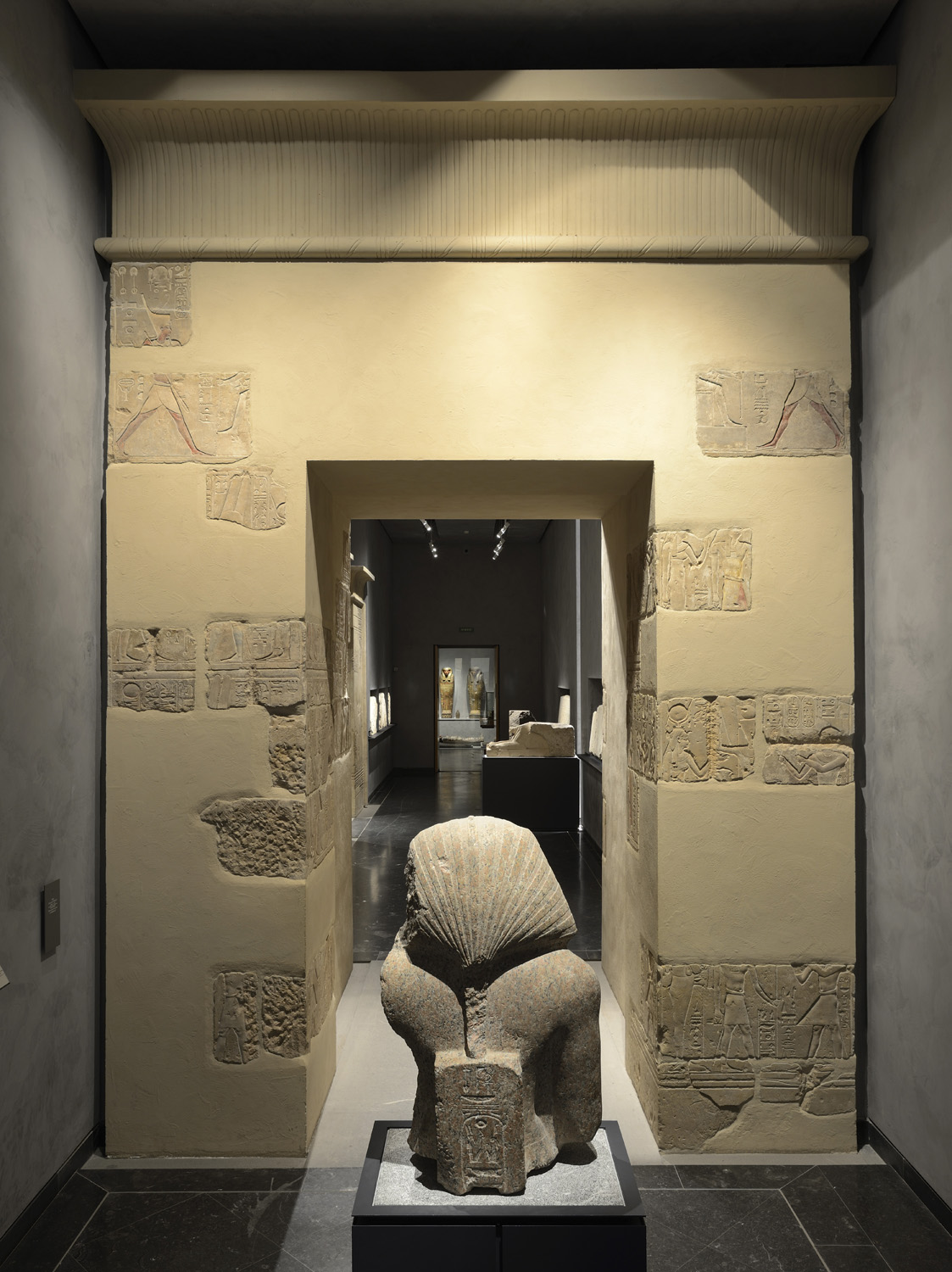
Gates to the temple of Medamud

In 1939, he excavated the gates of Ptolemy III and Ptolemy IV from the temple of Medamud, now in the Musée des beaux-arts de Lyon. He wrote his thesis in Egyptology on an important Egyptian functionary of the New Empire, Inscriptions concernant l'architecte Amenophis, fils de Hapou (published by Jean Vercouter. IFAO, 1968). In 1944, he was made taken on as an expert by the Service des Antiquités Orientales.

After having discovered during World War II the symbolic theory of the Group of Luxor, directed by R. A. Schwaller de Lubicz (1887-1961) who just settled in Egypt (since 1936, until 1952), Varille decided to invest his time in trying to provide the new opportunities offered by the Egyptian philosophy of symbols, also in the way to excavate in North Karnak since 1941 respecting new rules. He dedicated his first publication about Karnak (IFAO, 1942) to Schwaller de Lubicz. He only returned to France for short periods to publish with Clément Robichon the book entitled En Egypte, then published late 1955 in New York - Eternal Egypt was translated from French by Laetitia Gifford. He died in a car accident in France in 1951 just after the presentation of his symbolic theory at the French Institut, section Academy of Sciences.
