= Precinct of Montu =

Coordinates: 25.7199°N 32.6608°E

The Precinct of Montu, located near Luxor, Egypt, is one of the four main temple enclosures that make up the immense Karnak Temple Complex. It is dedicated to the Egyptian god Montu. The area covers about 20,000 m^{2}. Most monuments are poorly preserved.

== Features ==
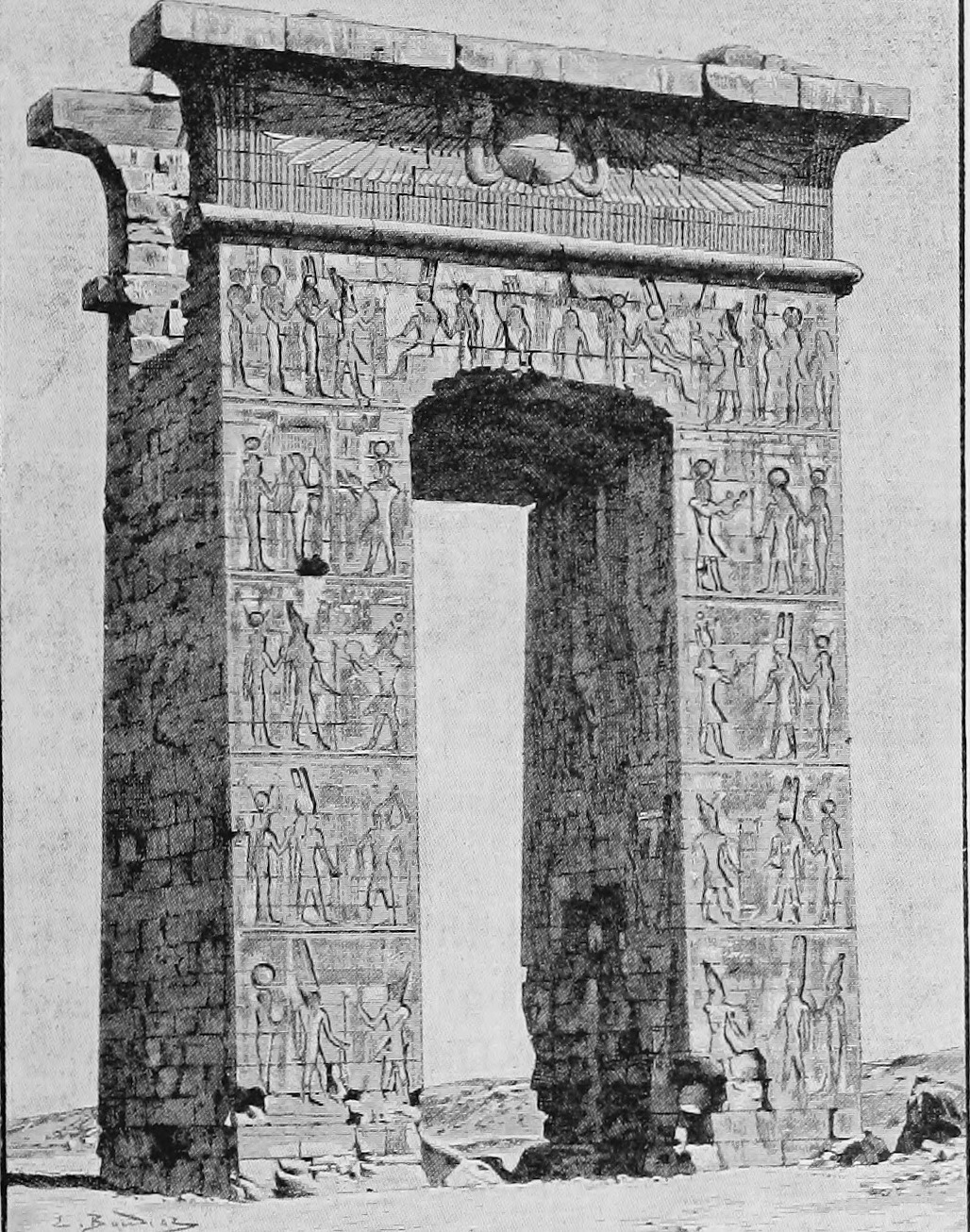
Gateway of Ptolemy III and Ptolemy IV

The main features of the Precinct of Montu are the Temple of Montu, Temple of Harpre, Temple of Ma'at, a sacred lake and the Gateway of Ptolemy III Euergetes / Ptolemy IV Philopator, which is the most visible structure on the site and can be easily seen from inside the Precinct of Amon-Re. This gateway is also called Bab el’Adb. This large monumental door was reached via a dromos leading from a quay that led to a channel which connected the field to that of Montu of Medamud further north of the city. Through this gate, is reached a large court which was decorated by a colonnade dating from the 25th Dynasty period. In the south, a series of doors opened onto a series of vaults of Divine Adoratrices, which were next to the northern part of the precinct of Amun-Re.

The enclosure was built of mud-brick and restored by Nectanebo in the 30th Dynasty

=== Temple of Montu ===
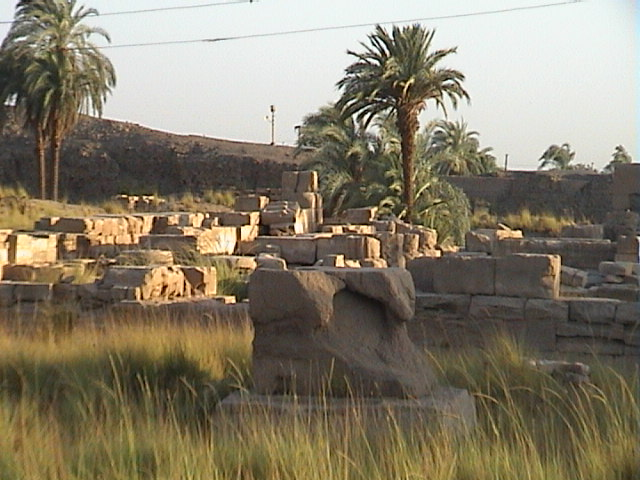
Ruins in the Precinct of Montu

This temple consisted of the traditional parts of an Egyptian temple with a pylon, court and rooms filled with columns. The ruins of the temple date to the reign of Amenhotep III who rebuilt the sanctuary dating from the Middle Kingdom era and dedicated it to Montu-Re. Ramesses II increased the size of the temple by adding a forecourt and erecting two obelisks there. A large court with gantry gave on hypostyle open on the court, characteristic of the buildings of the reign of Amenhotep I. The sanctuary is made up as follows: a room with four columns serving various vaults of the worship and giving on the room of the boat which preceded the naos by the god. Nearby in Medamud was another Temple of Montu.

=== Temple of Ma'at ===
The Temple of Ma'at is the only extant temple dedicated to the deity Ma'at. The temple served as a court which judged the plunderers of royal tombs under Ramesses IX at the end of the 20th Dynasty.

=== Temple of Harpre ===
The Temple of Harpre's first construction may date back to the 21st Dynasty, though it was for the most part built under Hakor of the 29th Dynasty.
