= Gates to the Temple of Medamud =

Gateways to the Temple of Montu in Egypt

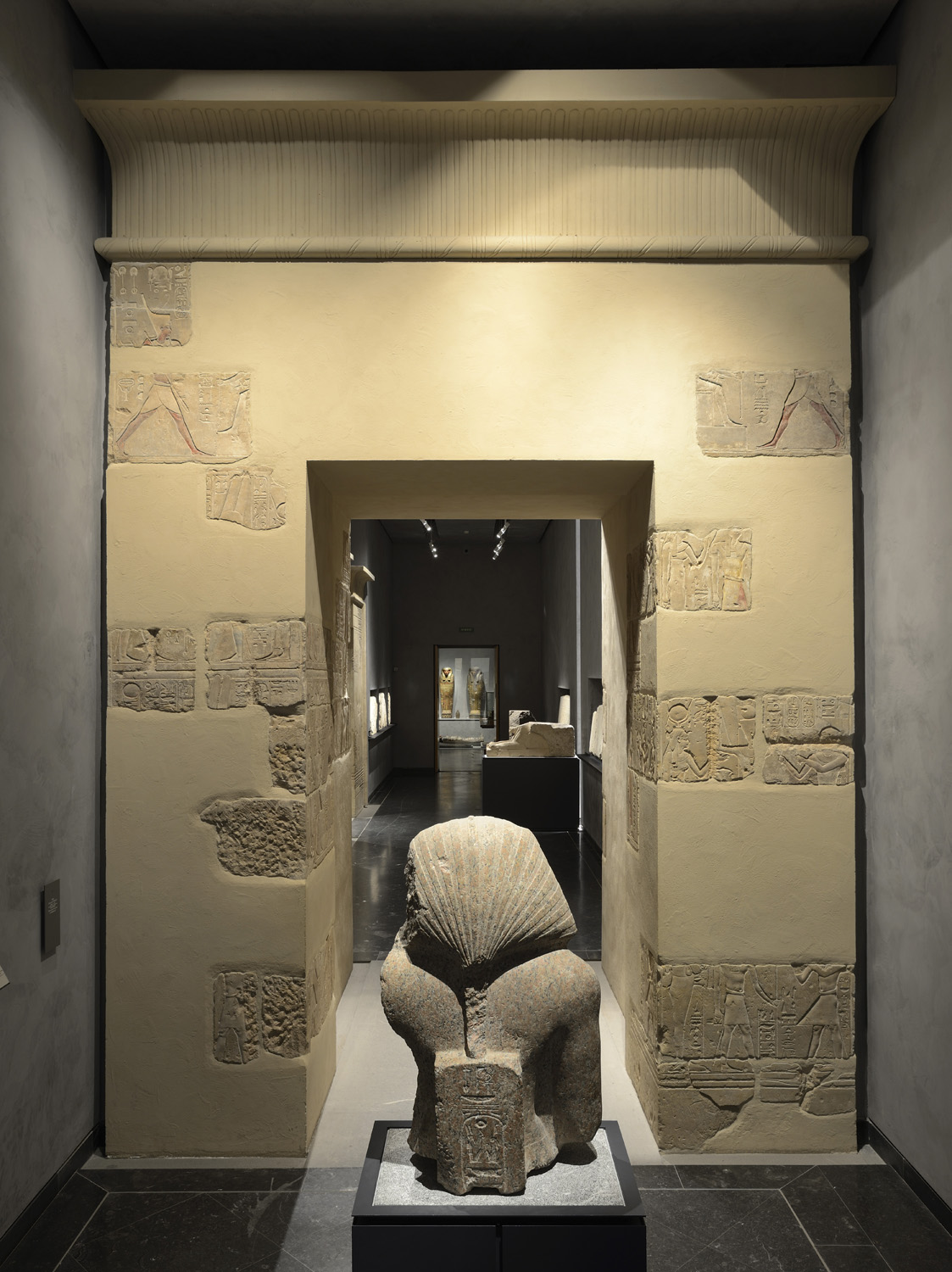
The temple gates

Gates to the Temple of Medamud are two monumental gateways to the Ptolemaic-era phase of the Temple of Montu at Medamud, located to the north of Luxor on the right bank of the Nile. They were excavated in 1939 by the French archaeologist Alexandre Varille and are now in the collection of the Museum of Fine Arts of Lyon.

The earlier of the two, the Gate of Ptolemy III, is only partly conserved but retains traces of its paintwork. Its bas-reliefs suggest it marked the entrance to an offerings room inside the temple. The later gate, the Gate of Ptolemy IV, could be wholly reconstructed and probably marked one of the main entrances to the temple.

== Sources ==
- Ch. Sambin, Les portes de Médamoud, Bulletin des Musées et monuments lyonnais 1988-3
