= Ishqi-Mari =

Ishqi-Mari 𒅖𒄄𒈠𒌷
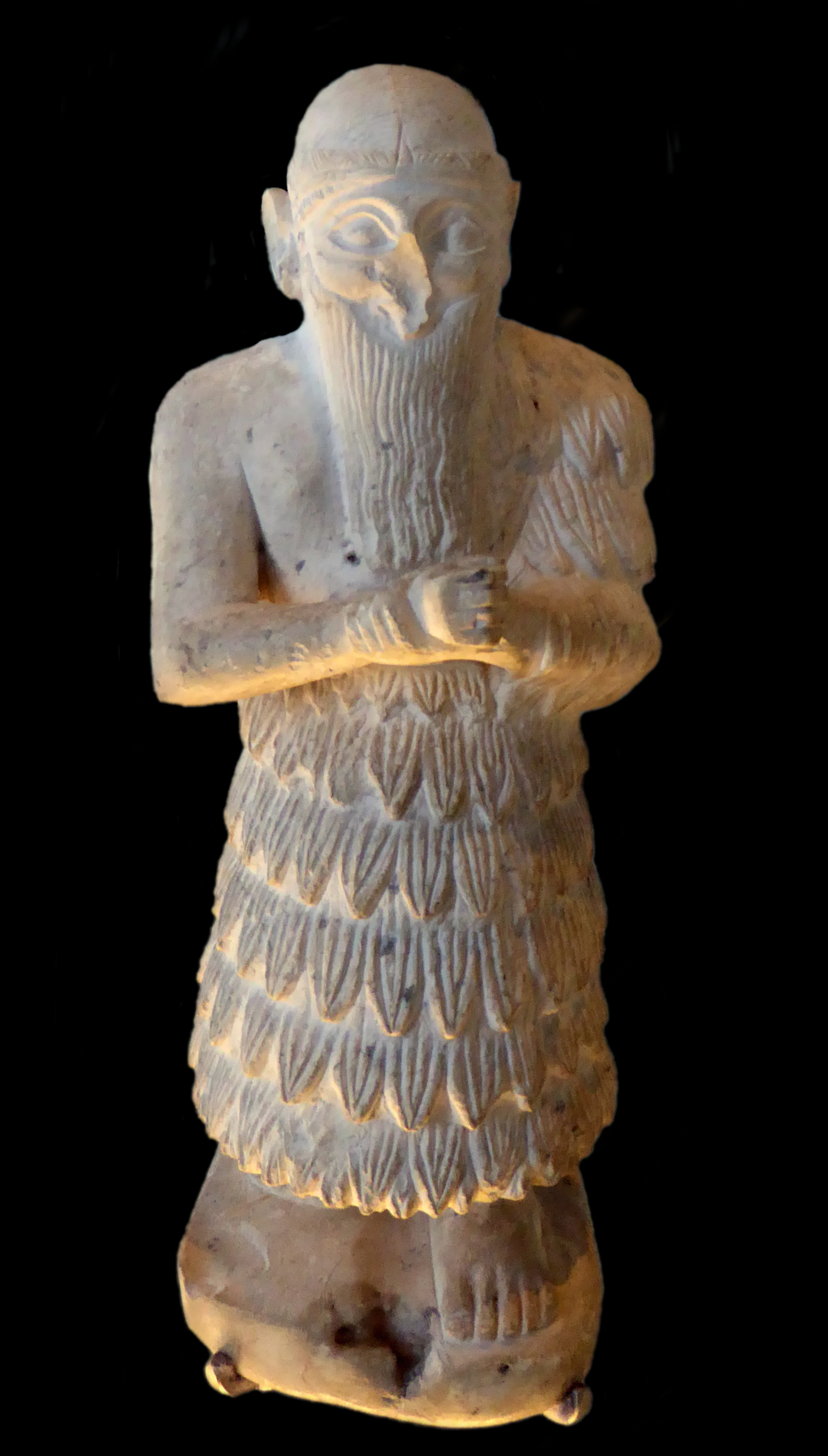
- Statue of Ishqi-Mari, Aleppo National Museum. Here seen at an exhibition in the Institut du Monde Arabe, Paris in 2014.

King of Mari
- Reign: c. 2350 - c. 2330 BC
- Died: c. 2330 BC

Location of Mari

Ishqi-Mari or Ishgi-Mari (𒅖𒄄𒈠𒌷 iš_{11}-gi_{4}-ma-rí; died c. 2330 BC), previously read Lamgi-Mari, was a King of the second Mariote kingdom. He is one of three Mari kings known from archaeology, Ikun-Shamash probably being the oldest one. The third king is Iku-Shamagan, also known from an inscribed statue.

In their inscriptions, these Mari kings used a dialect of the Akkadian language, whereas their Sumerian contemporaries to the south used the Sumerian language.

It is thought that Ishqi-Mari was the last king of Mari before the conquest and the destruction of Mari by Akkad under Sargon c. 2330 BC.

== Inscriptions ==
Ishqi-Mari is known from a statue with inscription. The statue is in the Aleppo National Museum. The inscription on the back of the statue reads:

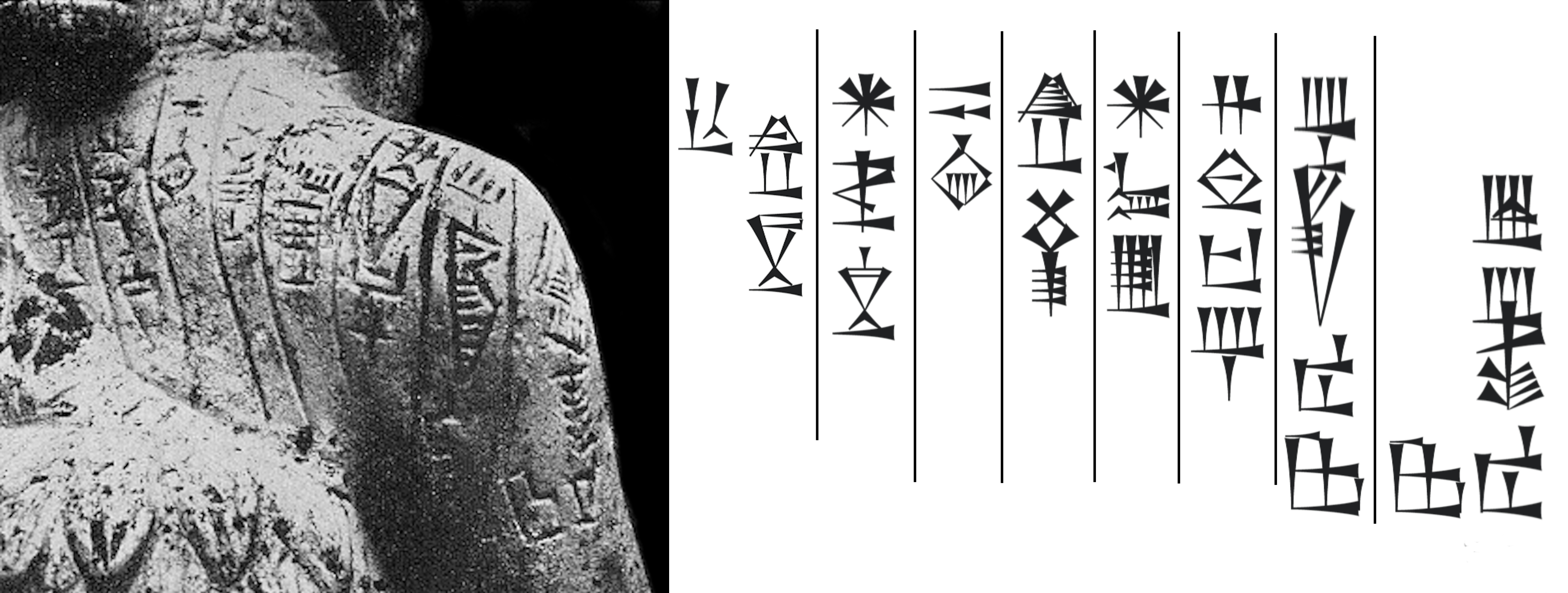
𒅖𒄄𒈠𒌷 / 𒈗𒈠𒌷 / 𒑐𒋼𒋛𒃲 / 𒀭𒂗𒆤 / 𒊨𒋤 / 𒀀𒈾 / 𒀭𒈹𒀴 / 𒊕𒄸𒁺

ish11-gi4-ma-ri2 / lugal ma-ri2 / ensi2 gal / ^{D}en-lil2 / dul3-su3 / a-na / ^{D}inanna-nita / sa12-rig9

"Ishqi-Mari, king of Mari, great ensi of Enlil, dedicated his statue to Inanna"

— Statue inscription of Ishqi-Mari.

This inscription was instrumental in identifying Tell Hariri with the Mari of antiquity.

Several cylinder seals with intricate designs in the name of "Ishqi-Mari, King of Mari" are also known.

== Discovery (23 January 1934) ==
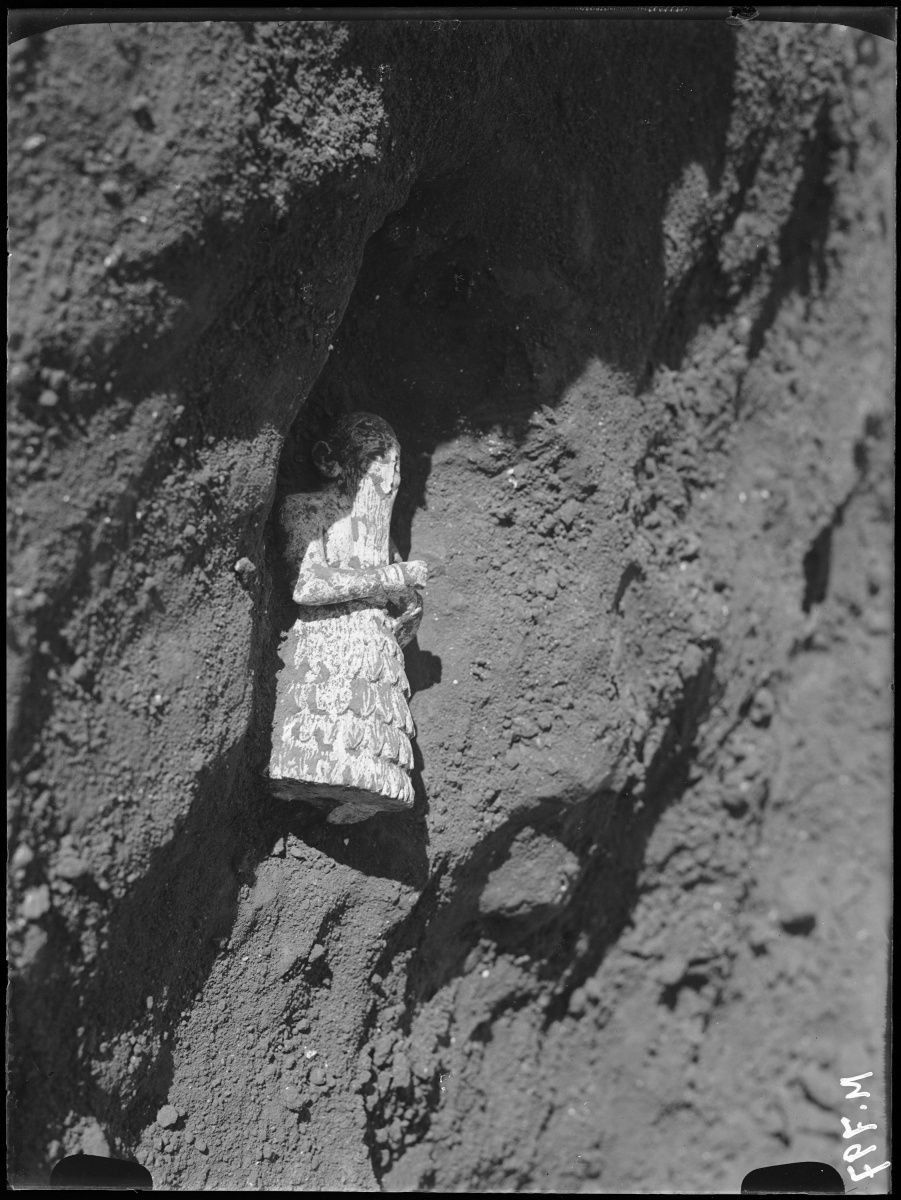
Excavation of the statue of Ishqi-Mari on 23 January 1934

The statue of Ishqi-Mari was discovered buried in the archaeological remains of the ancient city of Mari, in the Temple of Ishtar, by a French archaeological team led by André Parrot on 23 January 1934.

The statue shows Ishqi-Mari with a long beard and parted and plaited hair. He wears a hairbun similar to the Sumerian royal hairbuns, such as on the headdress of Meskalamdug or reliefs on Eannatum. He wears a fringed coat leaving one shoulder bare, a type of clothing also seen on contemporary Akkadian Empire depictions of rulers.

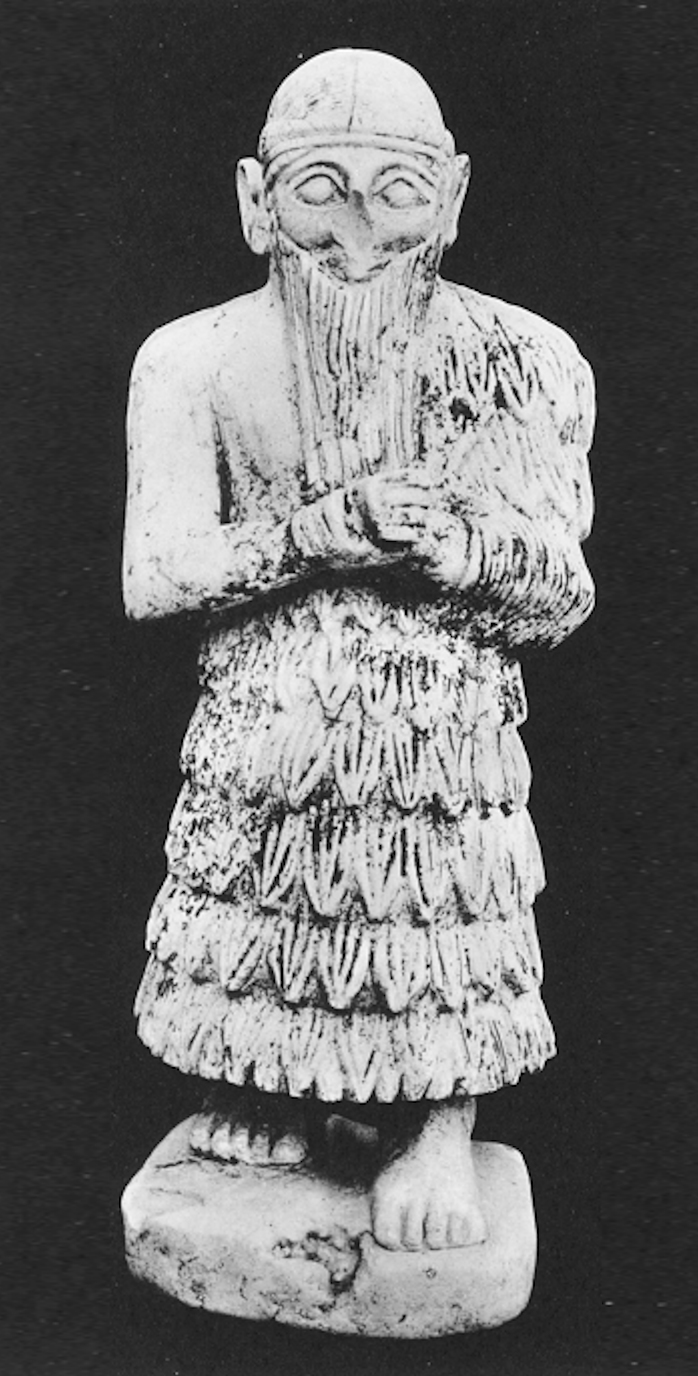
Ishqi-Mari statue (front)

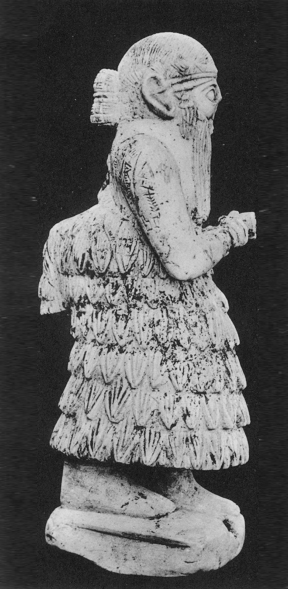
Ishqi-Mari statue (side)

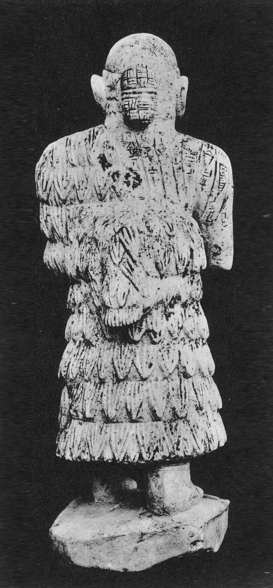
Ishqi-Mari statue (back)

== In Aleppo museum ==
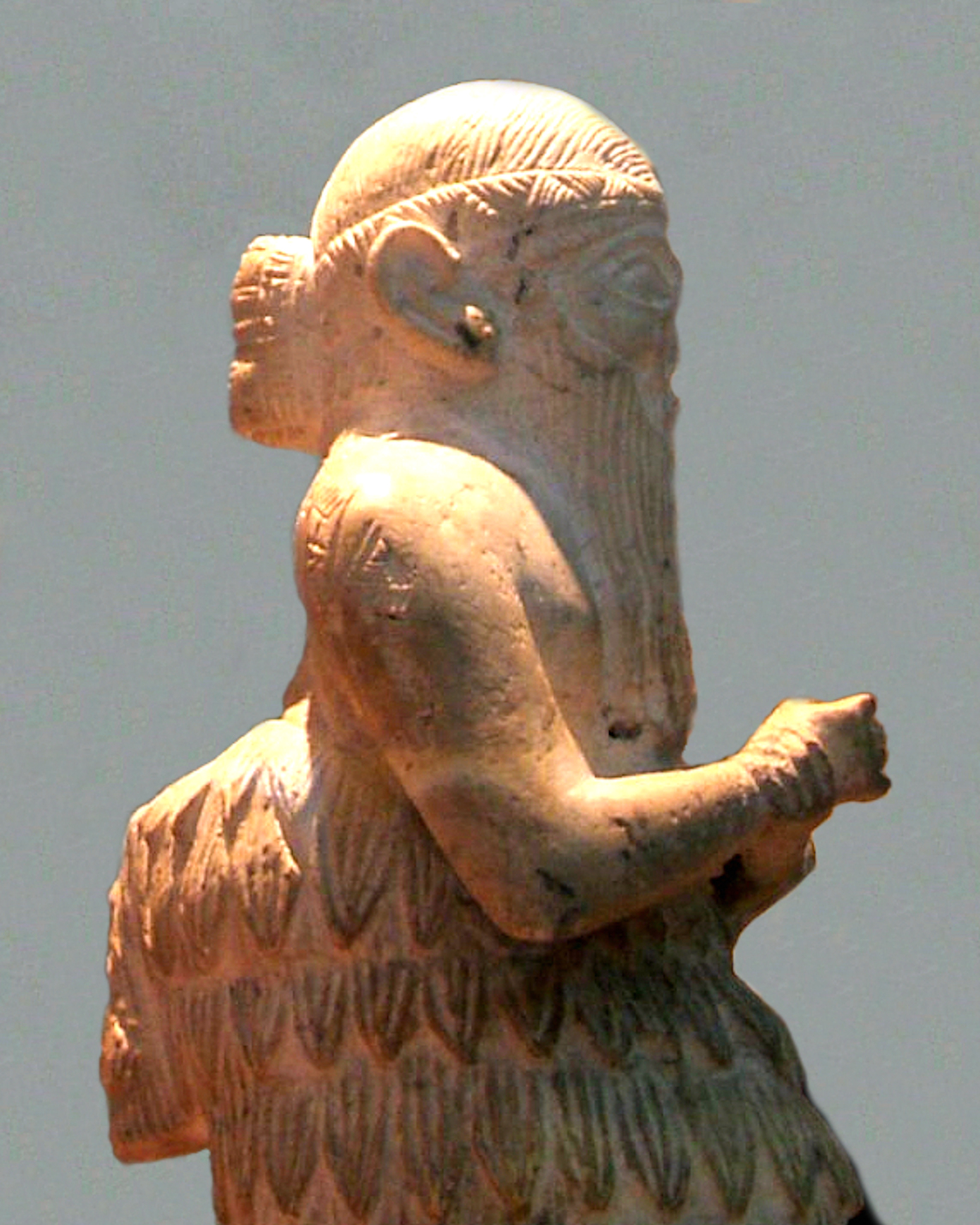
Ishqi-Mari in profile. He wears a hairbun similar the Sumerian royal hairbuns, such as on the headdress of Meskalamdug or reliefs on Eannatum. The inscription is visible on the back of the right shoulder.

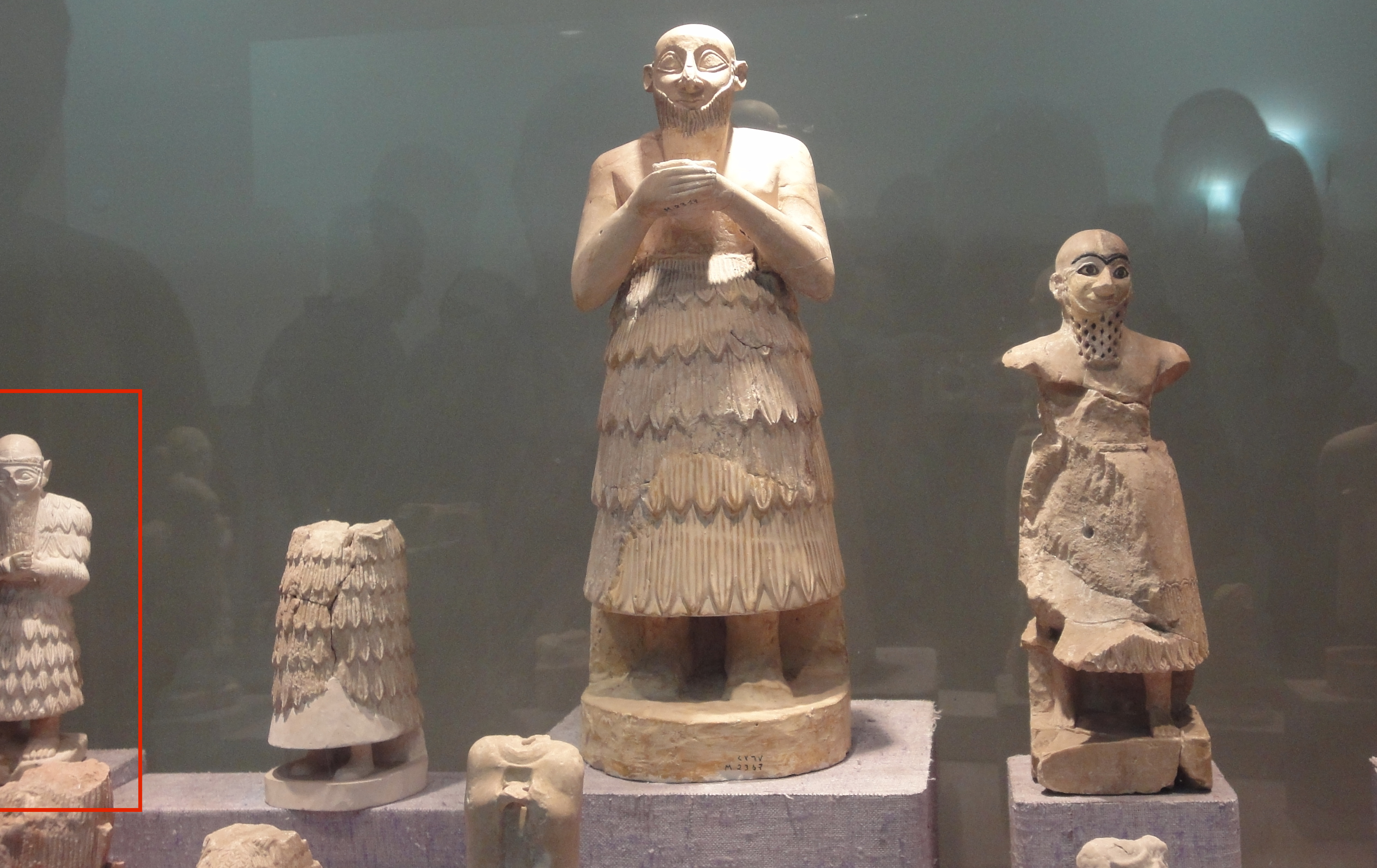
Statues from Mari. The statue of Ishqi-Mari appears partially on the left: it is much smaller than many of the traditional Mari statues. Aleppo National Museum.

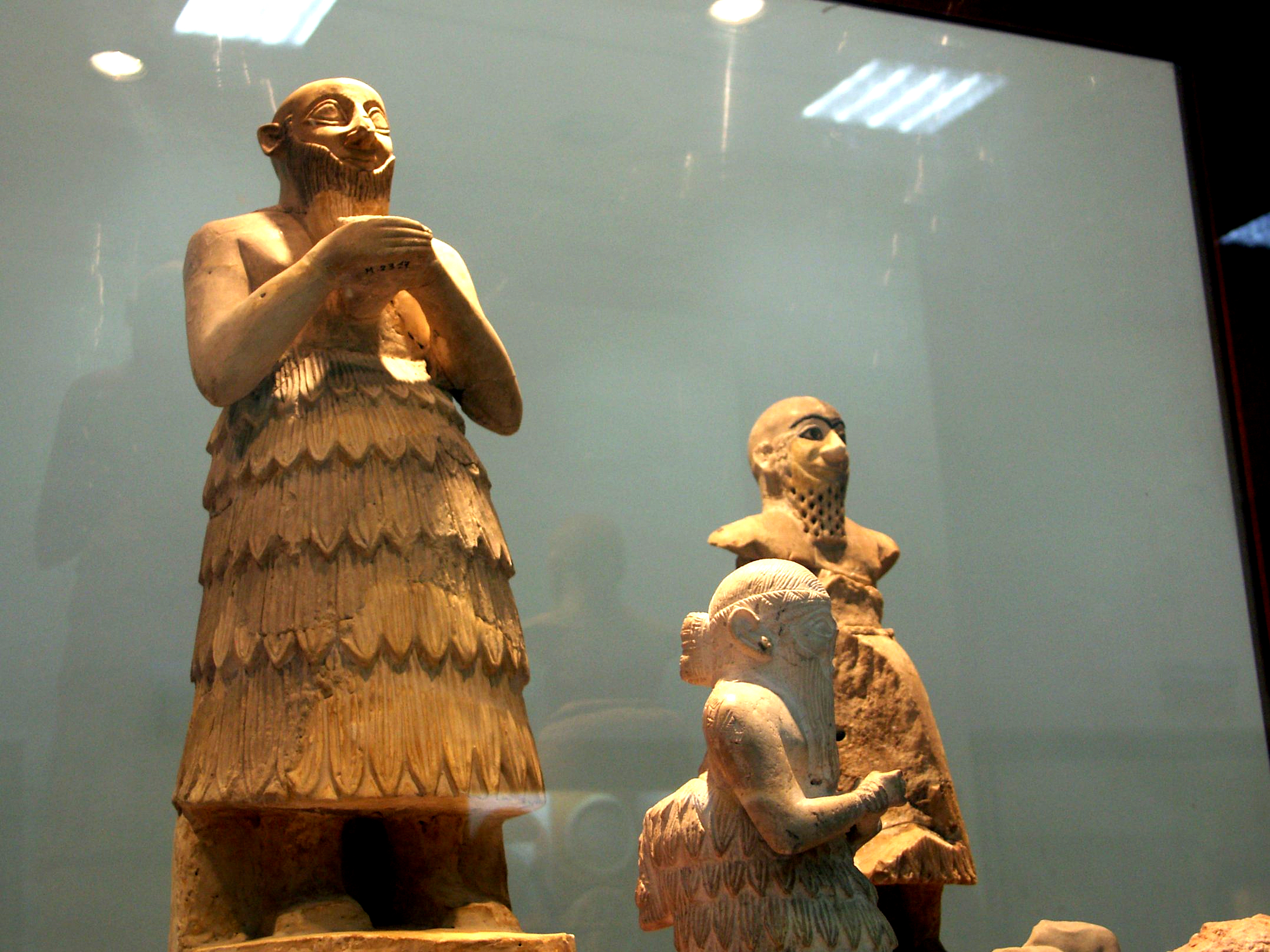
Ishqi-Mari (forefront, in profile), before larger figures

King Ishqi-Mari of Mari
Regnal titles
Preceded by Possibly Hidar	King of Mari c. 2350 - c. 2330 BC	Succeeded by Position possibly abolished
