= Iku-Shamagan =

Iku-Shamagan 𒄿𒆪𒀭𒊭𒈠𒃶
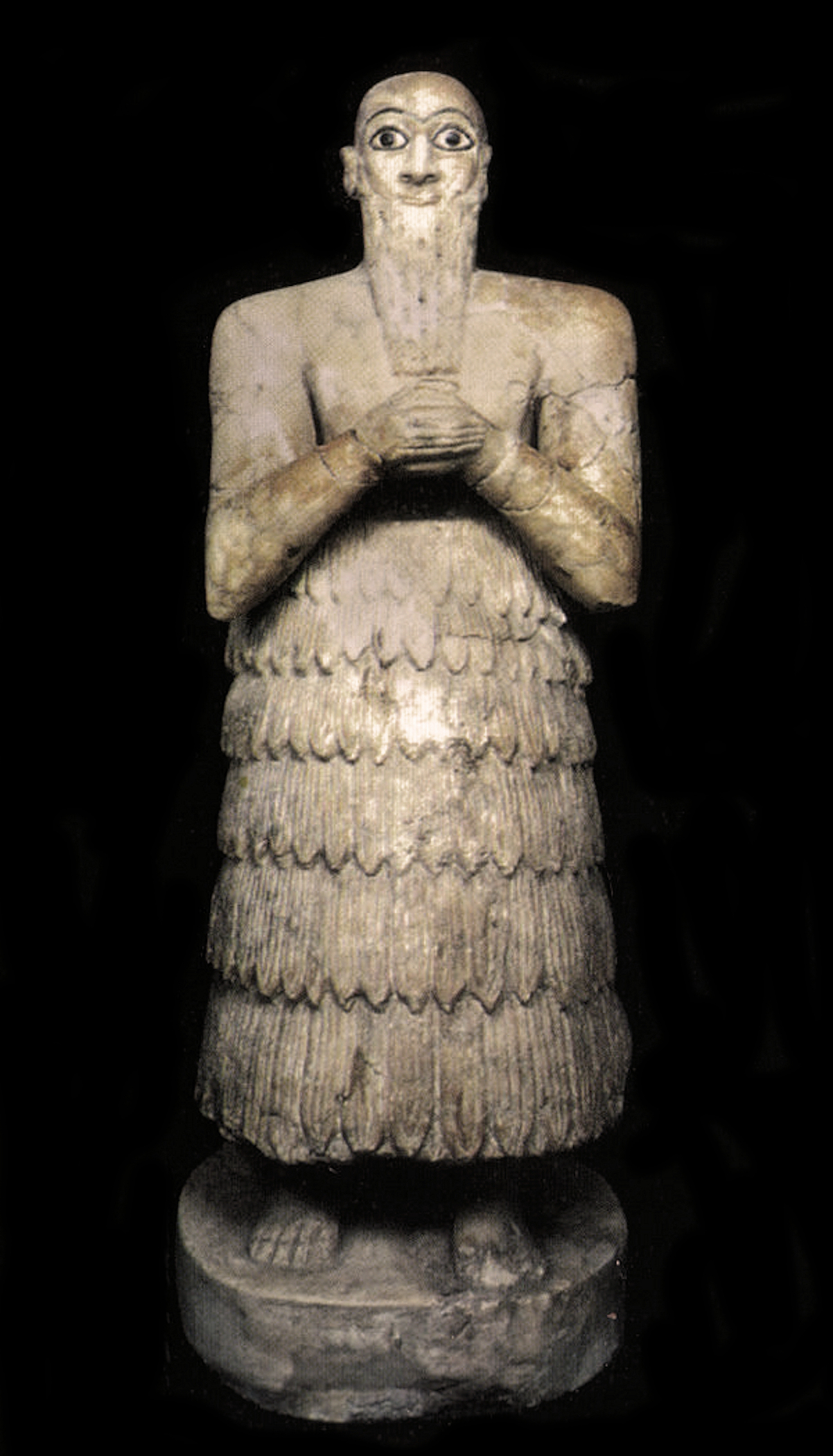
- Statue of Iku-Shamagan, Temple of Ninni-Zaza, Mari. National Museum of Damascus

King of Mari
- Reign: c. 2500 BC
- Predecessor: Possibly Ikun-Shamash
- Successor: Possibly Ishqi-Mari

Location of Mari

Iku-Shamagan (𒄿𒆪𒀭𒊭𒈠𒃶, i-ku-^{D}sha-ma-gan, fl. c. 2500 BC) was a King of the second Mariote kingdom. He is one of three Mari kings known from archaeology, Ikun-Shamash probably being the oldest one. Another king was Ishqi-Mari, also known from an inscribed statue.

In their inscriptions, these Mari kings used the Akkadian language, whereas their contemporaries to the south used the Sumerian language.

== Vase ==
A vase mentioning Iku-Shamagan "in an early semitic dialect" is also known:

"For Iku-Shamagan, king of Mari, Shuweda the cup-bearer, son of ... the merchant, dedicated this vessel to the river god and Ishtarat"

— Vessel inscription.

== Statue ==
Iku-Shamagan is known from a statue with inscription, discovered by André Parrot in 1952. The statue, in the National Museum of Damascus, was restored by the Louvre Museum in 2011.

Iku-Shamagan's votive statue was dedicated through an inscription on the back of the statue:

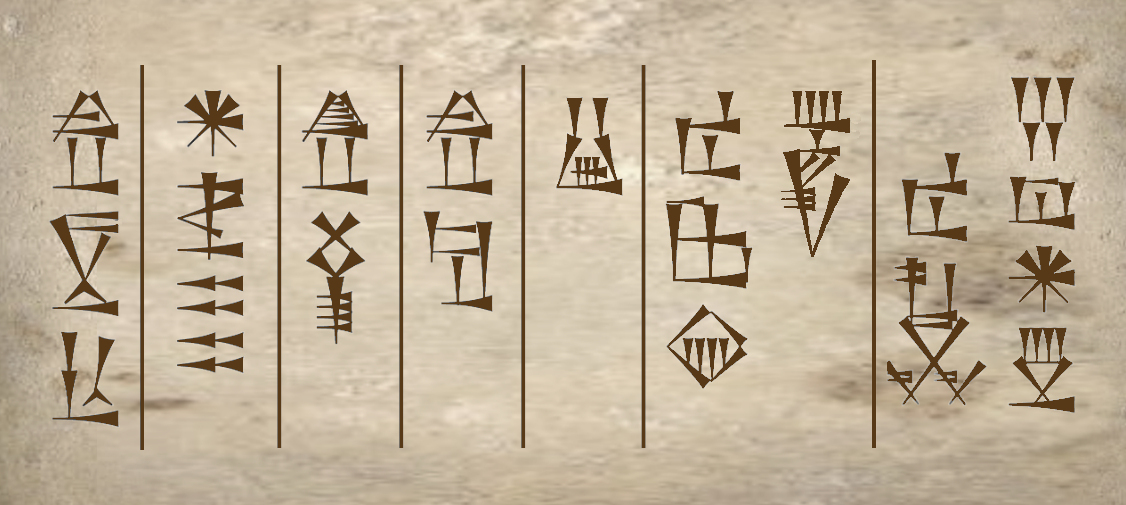
𒄿𒆪𒀭𒊭𒈠𒃶 / 𒈗𒈠𒌷𒆠 / 𒀋 / 𒊕𒂅 / 𒊨𒋤 / 𒀭𒈹𒍝𒍝 / 𒊕𒄸𒁺

i-ku-^{D}sha-ma-gan / lugal ma-ri2^{ki} / abba2 / sa12du5 / dul3su3 / ^{D}MUSZ3xZA.ZA / sa12rig9

"Of Iku-Shamagan, king of Mari, his surveyor has dedicated the statue to Ninni-zaza"

— Inscription on the statue of Iku-Shamagan

The statue was discovered in Mari, in the Temple Ninni-zaza.

The statue was heavily damaged during the conquest by the armies of the Akkad around 2300 BC.

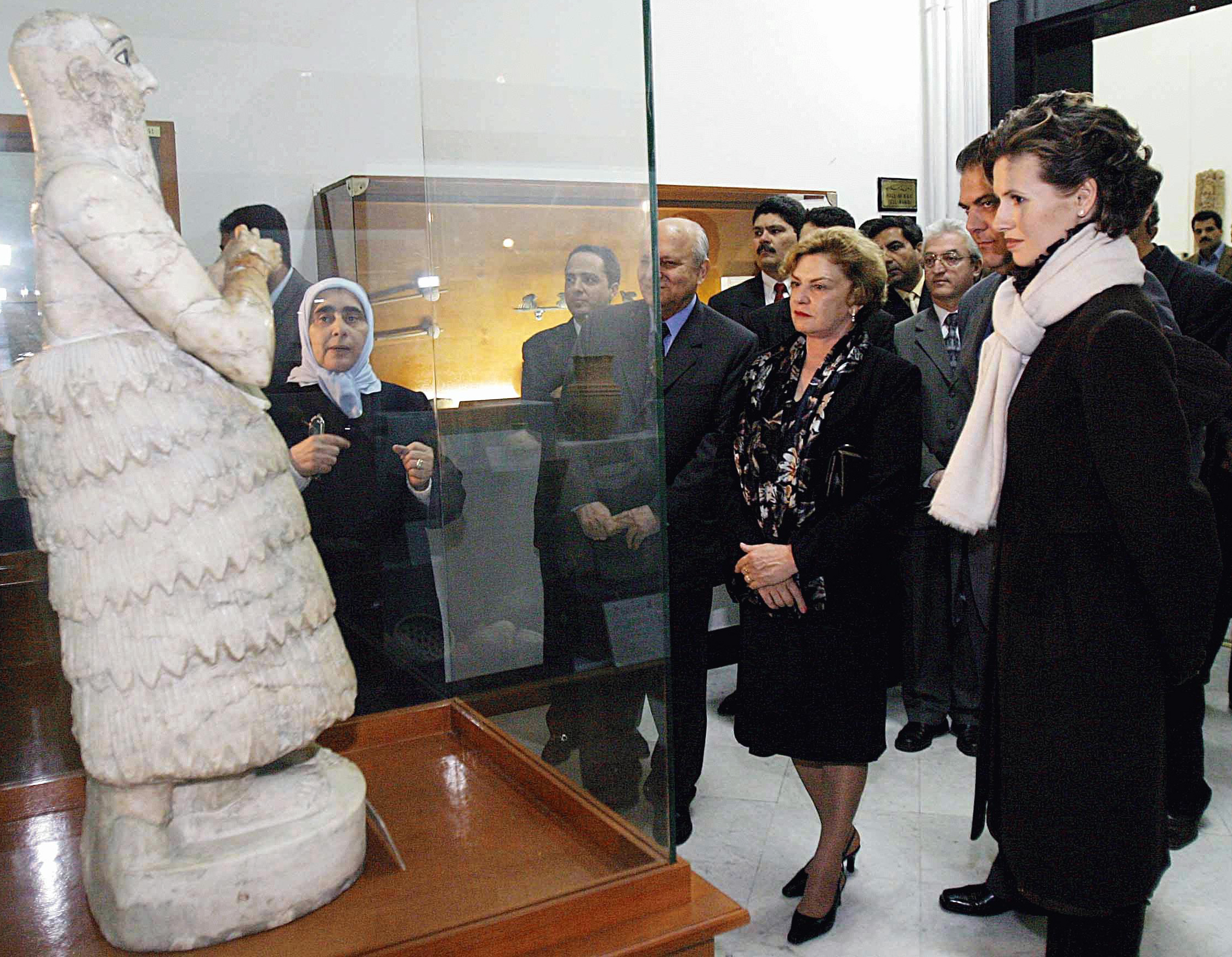
Asma al-Assad and Marisa Leticia looking at the statue of Iku-Shamagan in the National Museum of Damascus

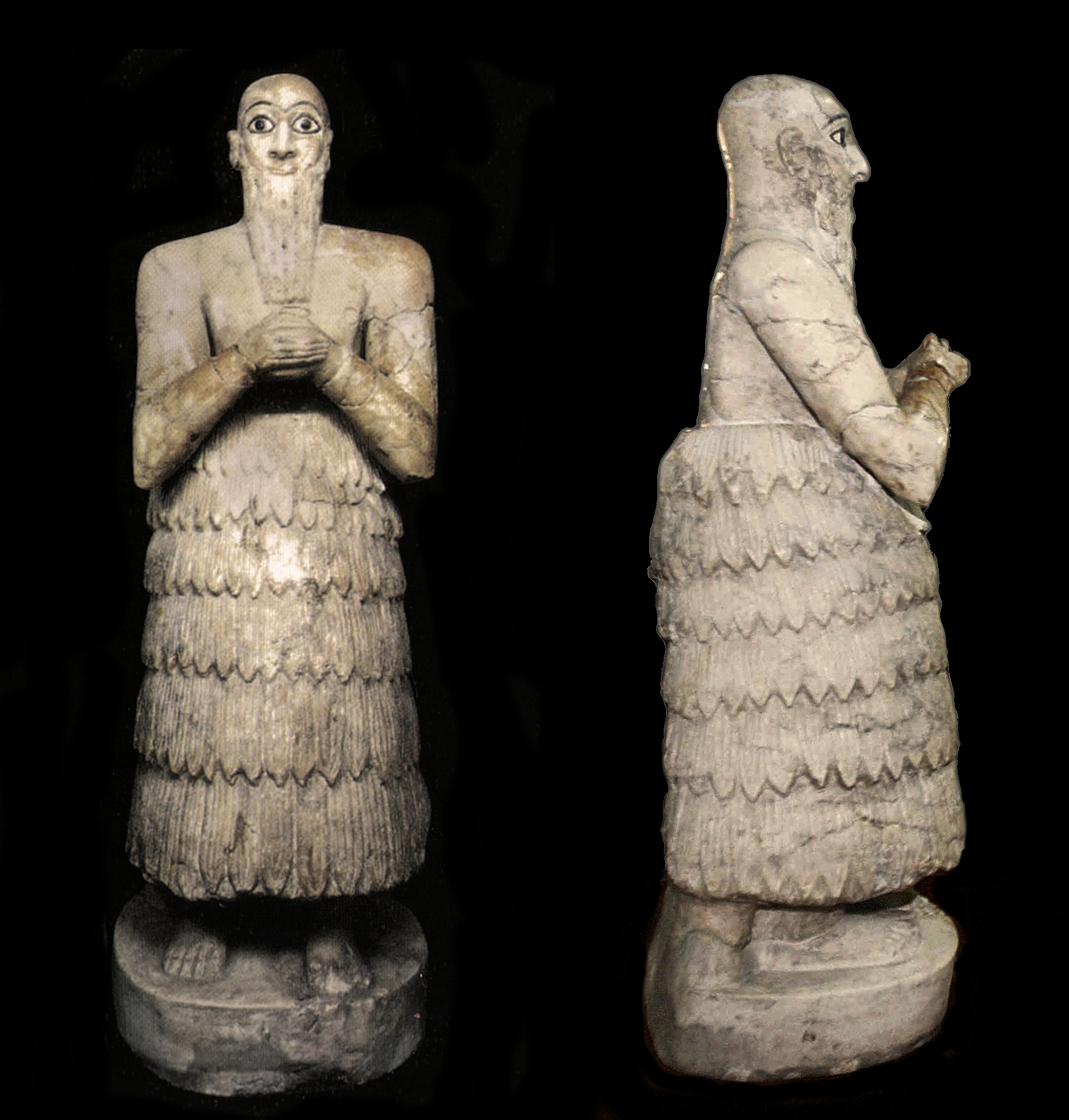
Statue of Iku-Shamagan with votive inscription on the back of the right shoulder. National Museum of Damascus

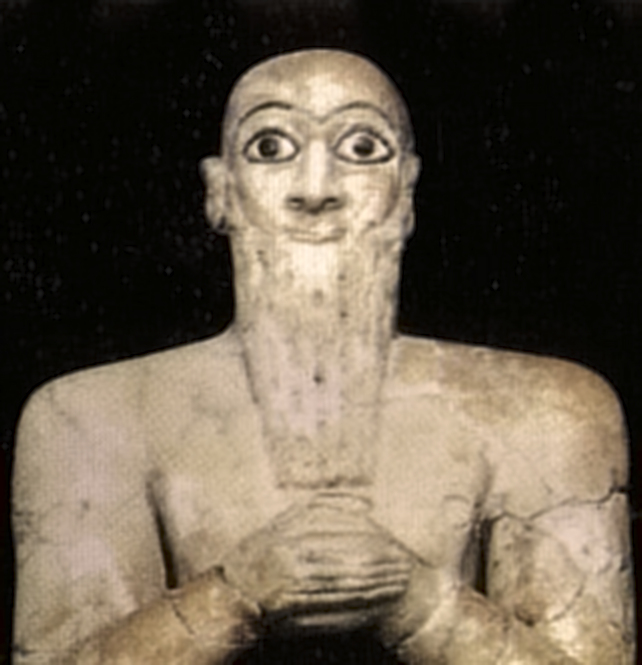
Iku-Shamagan (detail)

King Iku-Shamagan of Mari
Regnal titles
| Preceded by Possibly Ikun-Shamash | King of Mari c. 2500 BC | Succeeded by Possibly Ishqi-Mari |
