= R. A. Schwaller de Lubicz =

French egyptologist

René Adolphe Schwaller de Lubicz
- Born: René Adolphe Schwaller; December 30, 1887; Alsace–Lorraine, German Empire
- Died: December 7, 1961 (aged 73)
- Known for: Esotericism, alternative Egyptology
- Spouse: Isha Schwaller de Lubicz
- Children: Lucy Lamy, adopted daughter

René Adolphe Schwaller de Lubicz (born René Adolphe Schwaller December 30, 1887 – December 7, 1961), was a French Egyptologist and mystic who popularized the idea of sacred geometry in ancient Egypt during his study of the art and architecture of the Temple of Luxor in Egypt, and his subsequent book The Temple In Man. Many of de Lubiscz's claims have been rejected by mainstream Egyptologists, but embraced by promoters of "alternative Egyptology".

== Early life ==
René Schwaller was born in Alsace-Lorraine and left home at the age of eighteen after having completed an apprenticeship with his father in pharmaceutical chemistry. Moving to Paris from Alsace to study modern chemistry and physics, he developed an interest in Alchemy, reading every alchemical text he could find including those by Paracelsus and Ramon Llull. He also developed an interest in painting and became the student of Matisse.

He was given the title "de Lubicz" in 1919 by the Lithuanian writer, mystic and diplomat Oscar Vladislas de Lubicz Milosz.

He also wrote under the mystical name 'Aor', signifying "Light of the Higher Mind".

He may have become a student of Theosophy and Syncretism, as those two concepts are extensively tackled in his books.

== Les Veilleurs ==
Schwaller de Lubicz was the founder in 1919, with other members of the Theosophical Society, of the esoteric right-wing French group called Affranchis, that published a journal L'Affranchi-Hiérarchie, Fraternité, Liberté, a monthly journal of art and philosophy, dealing with a spiritual and social renewal within the framework of a mystical political philosophy. Its president was René Bruyez. On 23 July 1919 the group dissolved and another group was formed in its place: Les Veilleurs ("the Vigilants"), to which (at least according to the historian Pierre Mariel) the young Rudolf Hess belonged. Its uniform consisted of a dark shirt, high-boots and riding-breeches, akin to the Sturmabteilung.

Les Veilleurs delivered its manifesto in December 1919, its politics conveyed through a series of letters called "Appeals" and signed by its members. The letter signed by "Aor" was addressed "To the Jews", where he advised all Jews to "go back home". The first issue of its journal, Veilleur, contained an anonymous antisemitic article that first appeared in a Masonic journal from 1898.

The artist André Vanden Broeck in his memoirs and biography of Schwaller de Lubicz described him as antisemitic, and Joscelyn Godwin commented "Schwaller de Lubicz was not sufficiently vindictive to persist in the course of action followed by Hess and Hitler, but nor was he sufficiently humane, it would seem, to regret his contribution to the currents of the time."

In his biography of Schwaller de Lubicz, La Vie et l'œuvre de Rene Schwaller de Lubicz, Érik Sablé writes, "The feigned Nazi connections of de Lubicz, some purportedly claim, are spurious, unfounded, and totally without merit; which only exposes the shallow nature of those authors who succumb to the victor’s stories."

== Suhalia ==
During the 1920s with his wife Isha, Schwaller de Lubicz established in Switzerland the Station Scientifique Suhalia, a research centre consisting of "laboratories for physics, chemistry, micro-photography and the manufacture of homeopathic tinctures, along with an astronomical observatory, a machine shop, workshops for woodworking, blacksmithing, printing, weaving, rugmaking and glassmaking and a theater." While there, Schwaller de Lubicz brought to a total whole his philosophical vision and in 1926 published his book L'Appel du Feu, where his "inspiration and higher intelligence is personified as 'Aor' (Hebrew for 'intellectual light')." Suhalia became the location where he began to "elaborate his philosophy of the evolution of consciousness."

In Suhalia, between 1926 and 1927 Schwaller created an Egyptian Tarot Game consisting of 25 cards (originally in black and white), partly copied and partly inspired by Egyptian gods paintings. The Italian painter and musician Elmiro Celli and Lucie Lamy, daughter of Isha, are supposed to have contributed to the realization of this "game of life"; but the active participation of Isha in planning is not to be excluded, being a passionate Egyptologist and scholar of comparative religions (Judaism, Christianity, Islam, Hinduism, Buddhism and Taoism).

== Egypt ==
Schwaller de Lubicz lived in Egypt for twelve years, studying the temples of Thebes in detail. He, with the French Egypologist Alexandre Varille, developed the symbolist approach to ancient Egypt. He argued that Egyptian temples were used for mystical initiations, and that their design incorporated symbolism expressing a belief system that combined religion, philosophy, art, and science. He believed, for instance, that the Egyptians were aware of astronomical concepts like axial precession, which was reflected in their religious beliefs. He linked the astrological age of Gemini with the development of the dualistic themes in Egyptian religion, the age of Taurus with the bull god Apis, and the age of Aries with the god Amun, who was depicted as a ram. He also argued that the human form was the basis for ancient Egyptian architecture, and he equated parts of the temples with parts of the human body. His three-volume work The Temple in Man includes a drawing that compares the plan of Luxor Temple to the shape of a human skeleton. Lynn Picknett and Clive Prince argue that these ideas were influenced by Schwaller de Lubicz's existing beliefs, such as Syncretism and Theosophy. Like many other esotericist figures, he believed that Egyptian civilization dated back much farther than conventional Egyptian chronology allows.

Mainstream Egyptologists have largely ignored his claims or viewed them with hostility, although Erik Hornung points out that his survey of Luxor Temple contains information useful to anyone studying the temple today. He is an influential figure among the advocates of theories about ancient Egypt that challenge the conclusions of mainstream Egyptology—theories that are sometimes labeled "alternative Egyptology". Many adherents of George Gurdjieff's Fourth Way find parallels in Schwaller de Lubicz's writings, and he has been an inspiration to authors like John Anthony West, whose claims about the great age of the Great Sphinx of Giza are inspired by those of Schwaller de Lubicz, and Naomi Ozaniec.

== Works ==
- Études sur les Nombres (Aor publications, 1917). English translation titled A Study of Numbers: A Guide To The constant creation of The Universe (Rochester, Vermont: Inner Traditions International, 1986). ISBN 0-89281-112-9
- L'appel du feu (Saint-Moritz: "Montalia", 1926). Facsimile reprint, Deuil-la-Barre: MCOR-la Table d'émeraude, 2002. ISBN 2-914946-00-7
- Adam l'homme rouge: ou les elements d'une gnose pour le mariage parfait (Montalia's Editions, St.-Moritz, 1926). Reprint Slatkine Editions, Geneva, 2014, with an introduction from Emmanuel Dufour-Kowalski as a contribution to schwallerian's studies, ISBN 978-2-05-102608-6
- Le Temple dans l'homme (Le Caire, Impr. de Schindler, 1949). English translation titled The Temple In Man: The Secrets of Ancient Egypt (Brookline: Autumn Press, 1977). ISBN 0-394-42079-9. Published in 1981 by Inner Traditions titled The Temple In Man: Sacred Architecture and The Perfect Man. ISBN 0-89281-021-1.
- Du symbol et de la symbolique (published privately in 1951. Paris: Dervy, 1978). English translation titled Symbol And The Symbolic: Egypt, Science, and The Evolution of Consciousness (Brookline, Massachusetts: Autumn Press, 1978). ISBN 0-394-73513-7
- Le Temple de l'homme, Apet du Sud à Louqsor (Paris: Caractères, 1957). English translation titled The Temple of Man: Apet of The South at Luxor (Rochester, Vermont: Inner Traditions, 1998). ISBN 0-89281-570-1
- Propos Sur Ésotérisme et Symbole (Paris: La Colombe, 1960).
- Le Roi de la Théocratie Pharaonique (Paris: Flammarion, 1961, originally published privately in 1958). English translation titled Sacred Science: The King of Pharaonic Theocracy (New York: Inner Traditions International, 1982). ISBN 0-89281-007-6
- Le Miracle Égyptien, présenté par Isha Schwaller de Lubicz (Paris: Flammarion, 1963). English translation titled The Egyptian Miracle: An Introduction To The Wisdom of The Temple (New York: Inner Traditions International, 1985). ISBN 0-89281-008-4
- Les Temples de Karnak: contribution à l’étude de la Pensée Pharaonique (Paris: Dervy-Livres, 1982). ISBN 2-85076-153-2. English translation titled The Temples of Karnak (London: Thames & Hudson, 1999). ISBN 0-500-01923-1
- Nature Word (The Lindisfarne Press, 1982). ISBN 0-940262-00-2. Originally published titled Verbe Nature contained in Isha Schwaller de Lubicz, “Aor”: R. A. Schwaller de Lubicz. Sa vie. Son œuvre. (La Colombe, Éditions du Vieux Colombier, Paris, 1963).

== Using the name Aor ==
- La Doctrine: trois conférences faites à Suhalia, Noël 1926 (l'éditions de St Moritz, Officina Montalia, 1927). Facsimile reprint, Paris: Axis Mundi, 1988. ISBN 2-905967-03-X.

== Bibliography ==
- Emmanuel Dufour-Kowalski (editor and writer), Dossier H Schwaller de Lubicz: L'œuvre au Rouge (Éditions L'Âge d'Homme, 2006). ISBN 2-8251-3681-6
- Emmanuel Dufour-Kowalski (editor and writer), La Quête Alchimique de R. A. Schwaller de Lubicz: Conferences (1913-1956) (Collection "Archives" n°10. Archè: Milan, 2006). ISBN 978-88-7252-277-6
- Emmanuel Dufour-Kowalski (editor and writer), La Fraternité des Veilleurs, une société secrète au XXe siècle (1917-1921)(Collection "Archive" n°11. Archè: Milan, 2017). ISBN 978-88-7252-346-9
- Joscelyn Godwin, "Schwaller de Lubicz: les Veilleurs et la connexion Nazie", in Politica Hermetica, number 5, pages 101-108 (Éditions L'Âge d'Homme, 1991).
- Isha Schwaller de Lubicz, “Aor”: R. A. Schwaller de Lubicz. Sa vie. Son œuvre. (La Colombe, Éditions du Vieux Colombier, Paris, 1963).
- Andre Vandenbroeck, Al-Kemi: A Memoir: Hermetic, Occult, Political, and Private Aspects of R.A. Schwaller de Lubicz (Lindisfarne Books, 1990). ISBN 0-940262-31-2
- Aaron Cheak, 'Introduction to Schwaller de Lubicz', in Egyptian Tarot Schwaller de Lubicz (edited by Giordano Berti), Quarto Inferiore - Bologna, 2019, pp. 15–33.
