= Marie-Louise Girod =

French organist and composer

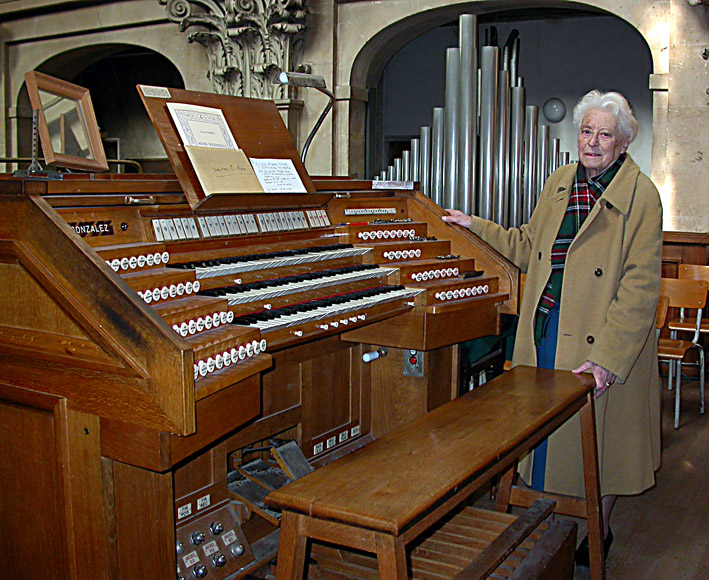
Girod at the organ of the Oratoire du Louvre (March 2004)

Marie-Louise Henriette Girod-Parrot (12 October 1915 – 29 August 2014) was a French organist and composer. She studied organ with Henriette Puig-Roget and Marcel Dupré at the Paris Conservatory.

She was the wife of archæologist André Parrot.

== Biography ==
Marie-Louise Henriette Girod was born in the 12th arrondissement of Paris on 12 October 1915. She was the only daughter of Henri William Girod (inspector at and representative of the raffinerie Lebaudy, born 1875) and Alice Marie-Louise Girod (née Frutière, born 1882).

She first studied the organ under Henriette Puig-Roget and later enrolled into the Conservatoire de Paris to study under Marcel Dupré (organ and improvisation), Norbert Dufourcq, and Noël Gallon (harmony). She obtained a first prize for organ and improvisation in 1941, a first prize for the history of music in 1944, and a first prize for fugue and counterpoint the same year. Among her classmates were Jeanne Demessieux and Pierre Segond. She was also a colleague of Jehan Alain, and heard him play his most famous composition, Litanies (JA 119), and also attended the 1,750th organ recital of Louis Vierne (where he suffered a heart attack and died). Her first pupil, who came to her when she was the titular organist of the Protestant Church in Belleville was the young Pierre Cochereau. His lessons were paid for by the latter's father, Georges Ernest Cochereau. She later described him as an optimistic student that was quite excited but needed to be controlled at times.

She was organist of the Reformed Church of the Oratoire du Louvre from 1941 to 2008 and of the Synagogue du Nazareth in Paris, a position Charles-Valentin Alkan formerly occupied. In 1953, she recorded the world première (conducted by Louis Martini) of the famous Te Deum, H. 146 by Marc-Antoine Charpentier (as of 2014 distributed by CD Erato). In 1961 she recorded music by Francis Seyrig on the organ of the Oratoire for Alain Resnais' film, L'Année last à Marienbad.

Girod lead an active concert career and was director of the Saint-Dié organ Academy, and also served as its honorary president. She was a member of the hymnology commission of the Protestant Federation of France, and also sat on the Higher Commission for Historical Monuments and on the Organ Commission of the City of Paris.

She was Protestant, and married archaeologist and historian André Parrot in 1960, becoming his second wife; and consequently became a stepmother to his five children from a previous marriage. She died on 29 August 2014 in Paris, aged 98.

== Selected works ==
- Petite cantate pour le jour de Pentecôte : recording with Marie-Louise Girod, Michel Wagner, Gérard Rouzier, Isabelle Hureau, Nassim Maalouf, Choeur du Marais. Lausanne VDE-Gallo 2008
