= Désandans =

- Commune
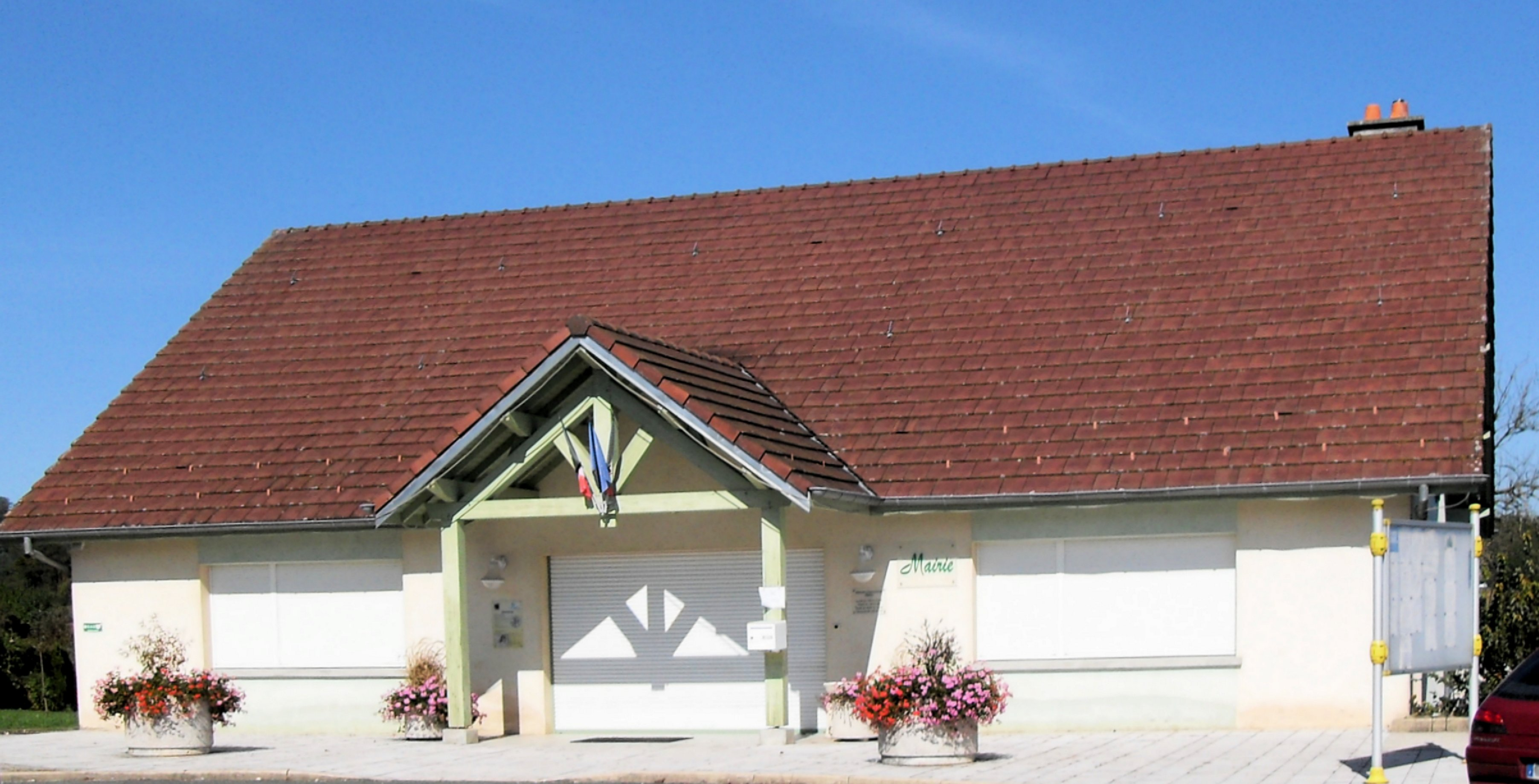
- The town hall in Désandans
- Location of Désandans
- Location within France Location within Bourgogne-Franche-Comté
- Coordinates: 47°32′02″N 6°40′41″E
- Country: France
- Region: Bourgogne-Franche-Comté
- Department: Doubs
- Arrondissement: Montbéliard
- Canton: Bavans

Government
  - Mayor (2020–2026): André Parrot
- Area^{1}: 5.47 km^{2} (2.11 sq mi)
- Highest elevation: 514 m (1,686 ft)
- Lowest elevation: 359 m (1,178 ft)
- Population (2023): 709
  - Density: 130/km^{2} (336/sq mi)
- Time zone: UTC+01:00 (CET)
  - Summer (DST): UTC+02:00 (CEST)
- INSEE/Postal code: 25198 /25750
- ^{1} French Land Register data, which excludes lakes, ponds, glaciers > 1 km^{2} (0.386 sq mi or 247 acres) and river estuaries.

Désandans (French pronunciation: [dezɑ̃dɑ̃]) is a commune in the Doubs department in the Bourgogne-Franche-Comté region in eastern France.

== Population ==
Historical population
Year	Pop.	±% p.a.
1968	344	—
1975	384	+1.58%
1982	390	+0.22%
1990	521	+3.69%
1999	586	+1.31%
2007	715	+2.52%
2012	715	+0.00%
2017	734	+0.53%
2023	709	−0.58%
Source: INSEE

== Notable natives ==
- André Parrot (1901–1980), archaeologist

== See also ==
- Communes of the Doubs department
