= Ikun-Shamash =

Ikun-Shamash 𒄿𒆪𒀭𒌓
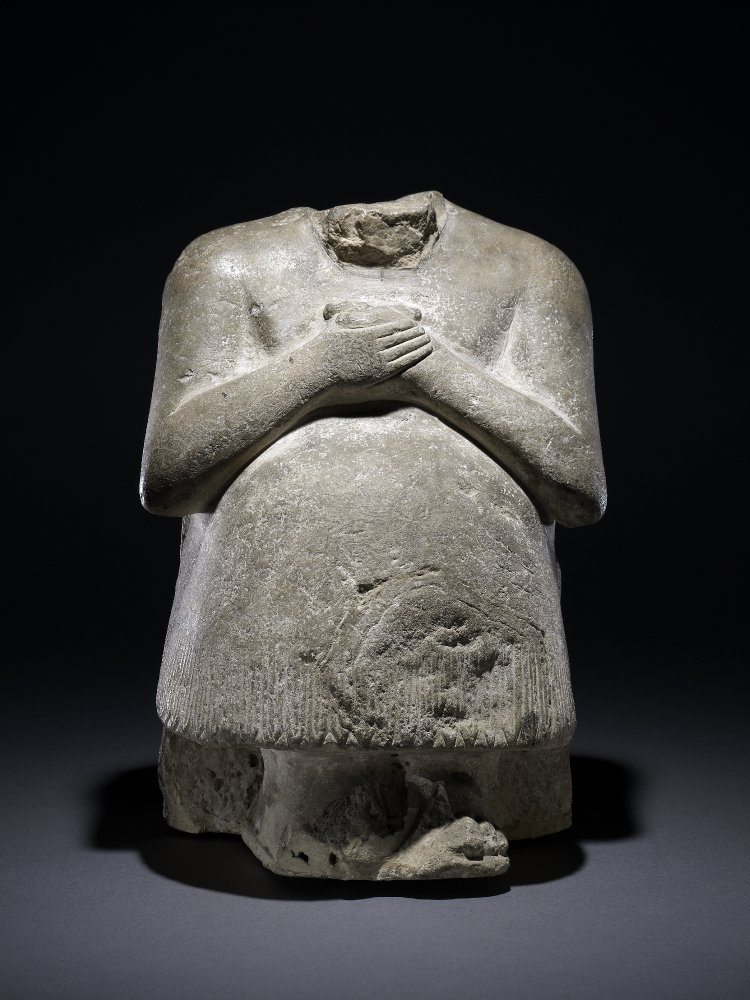
- Ikun-Shamash's votive statue, British Museum

King of Mari
- Reign: c. 2500 BC

Location of Mari

Ikun-Shamash or Iku-Shamash (𒄿𒆪𒀭𒌓; fl. c. 2500 BC) was a King of the second Mariote kingdom. According to François Thureau-Dangin, the king reigned at a time earlier than Ur-Nanshe of Lagash. He is one of three Mari kings known from archaeology, and probably the oldest one. Another king was Iku-Shamagan, also known from a statue with inscription, in the National Museum of Damascus. The third king is Ishqi-Mari, also read Išgi-Mari, also known from an inscribed statue now in the National Museum of Aleppo.

In his inscriptions, Ikun-Shamash used Akkadian, whereas his contemporaries to the south used Sumerian. His official title in the inscriptions was "King of Mari" and "ensi-gal", or "supreme Prince" of the deity Enlil.

He is known from a statue with inscription, which he dedicated to god Shamash.

Ikun-Shamash's territory seems to have included southern Babylonia.

== Statue ==
Ikun-Shamash's votive statue, set by one of his officials, was discovered in the city of Sippar; the inscription reads:

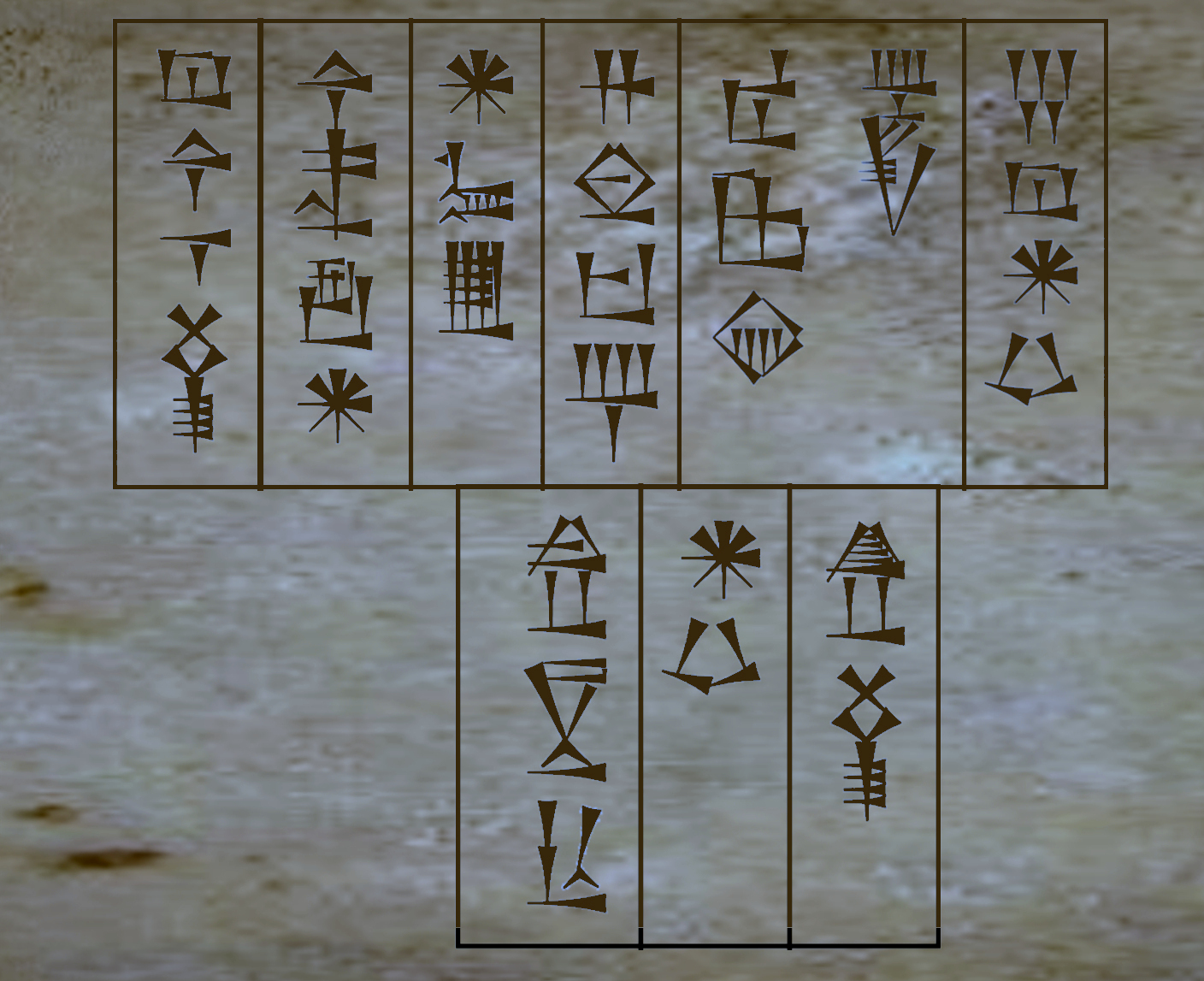
𒄿𒆪𒀭𒌓 / 𒈗𒈠𒌷𒆠 / 𒑐𒋼𒋛𒃲 / 𒀭𒂗𒆤 /𒅈𒊏𒀭 /𒆪𒅆𒈨𒋤 / 𒊨𒋤 / 𒀭𒌓 / 𒊕𒄸𒁺

i-ku-^{D}utu / lugal ma-ri2^{ki} / ensi2gal / ^{D}en-lil2 / ar-ra^{D} / tush igi{me}-su3 / dul3-su3 / ^{D}utu / sa12-rig9

"For Iku(n)shamash, king of Mari, chief executive for Enlil, Arra'il his courtier, dedicated his statue to Shamash"

— Statue inscription of Ikun-Shamash

The statue is located in the British Museum.

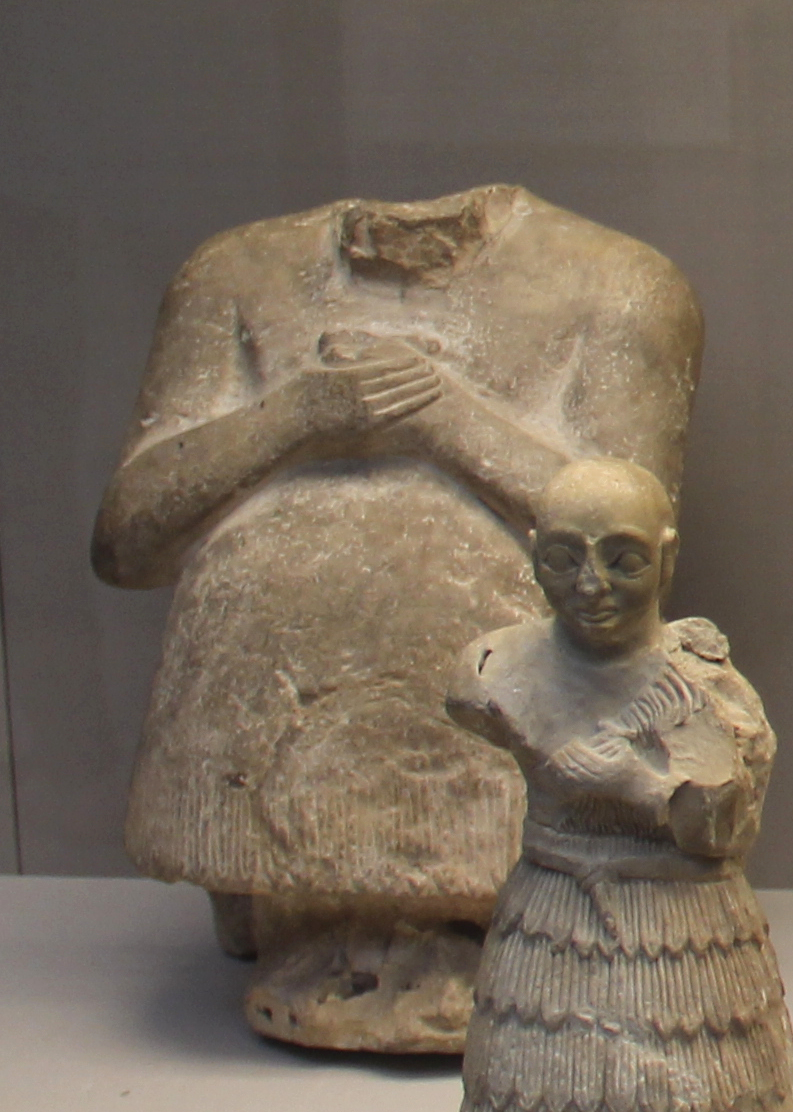
Statue of Iku-Shamash, King of Mari c. 2400 BC (in the rear)

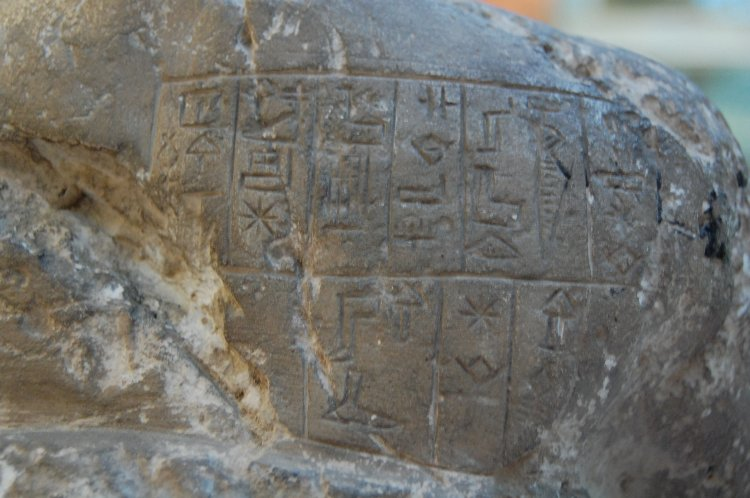
The inscription on the statue

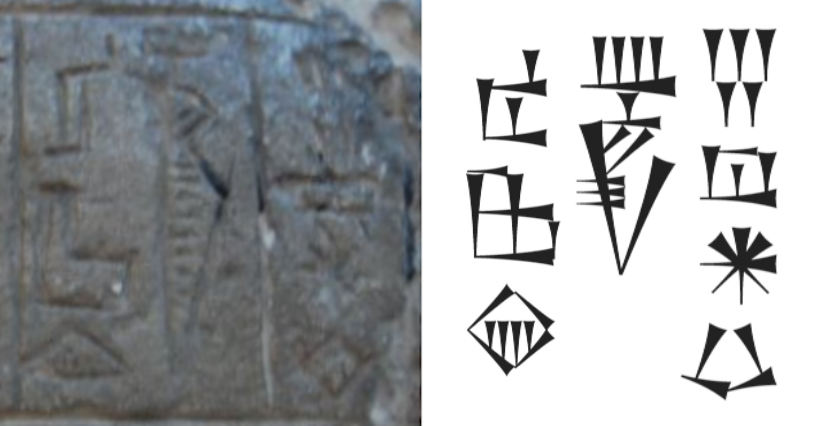
Inscription on the statue: "Ikun-Shamash, King of Mari" (𒄿𒆪𒀭𒌓 𒈗 𒈠𒌷𒆠, Ikun-shamash, lugal Mari-ki)

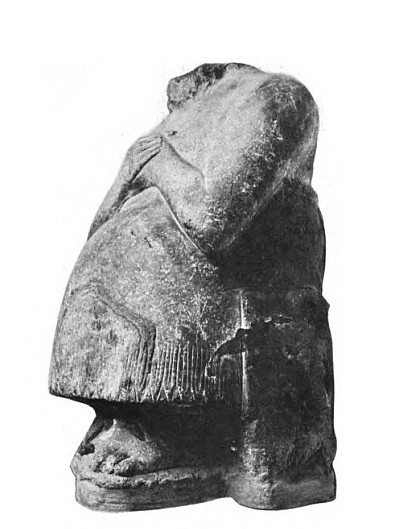
Statue of Ikun-shamash, British Museum, BM 90828

King Ikun-Shamash of Mari
Regnal titles
Preceded by	King of Mari c. 2500 BC	Succeeded by Possibly Iku-Shamagan
