= Marguerite Rutten =

French archaeologist and Assyriologist (1898–1984)

- Born: 18 October 1898; Paris
- Died: 7 April 1984 (aged 85); Nice, France
- Citizenship: France
- Education: École du Louvre
- Scientific career
- Fields: Assyriology
- Workplaces: École du Louvre
- Patrons: Charles Fossey, Georges Contenau, René Dussaud
- Thesis: Contrats de l'époque séleucide conservés au Musée du Louvre (1933, published in 1935)

Marguerite Rutten (18 October 1898, Paris - 7 April 1984, Nice) was a French archaeologist and Assyriologist.

== Biography ==
“Maggie” Rutten, of Dutch ancestry, studied first at the Institut Catholique de Paris (diplome 1930). Then she spent her entire career at the Louvre, first as a chargé de mission in the Department of Oriental Antiquities.

She graduated from the École du Louvre in 1933. She then became an attaché and in 1934 published a Guide to Oriental Antiquities in the Louvre Museum. She was one of the main actors of Charles Fossey's conference at the École pratique des hautes études and obtained the title of graduate student with a work under his direction (Contracts from the Seleucid period in the Louvre Museum). This book attracted the attention of André Aymard, “who thanked Miss Rutten for having accompanied her copies with translations and transcriptions, thus allowing Hellenists to have access to this documentation”. She became a lecturer in Sumerian and Assyrian epigraphy and published an introductory manual on Accadian. In 1937 she became Georges Contenau's assistant and in 1940, she was a substitute teacher at the École du Louvre for André Parrot, who had been mobilised. For thirty years, she also taught public art history courses on oriental archaeology at the École du Louvre in the evenings, as part of the Rachel Boyer Foundation. (Note: Rachel Boyer (1864-1935) was a French actress and philanthropist, resident at the Comédie-Française.)

The fact that she was a woman and, above all, personal enmities prevented Mr Rutten from taking up the position of Curator and she remained an assistant to the National Museums until her retirement. Aware of the injustice done to her, the Museums Administration gave her the title of Curator when she left the Oriental Department after 34 years of good and loyal service.

— Agnes Spycket

She died in Nice in 1984 where she spent the last twenty years of her life.

== Works ==
- Éléments d'accadien (assyro-babylonien), notions de grammaire (1937), Adrien-Maisonneuve, Paris, 1937.
- Babylone, Paris, Presses Universitaires de France, Paris, 1948, 32 editions published between 1948 and 1966 in 3 languages.
- La science des Chaldéens, Presses universitaires de France, Paris, 1960.
- Les arts du Moyen-Orient ancien, Paris, Presses Universitaires de France, Paris, 1963.

== Distinctions ==
- Officer of the Ordre des Arts et des Lettres
