= Denise Cocquerillat =

French archaeologist and Assyriologist (1918-1999)

- Born: 8 June 1918; Granville, France
- Died: 18 December 1999 (aged 81); Paris, France
- Education: École du Louvre
- Scientific career
- Fields: Assyriology, specialist in cuneiform texts
- Workplaces: French National Centre for Scientific Research
- Thesis: The Mace in Mesopotamian Iconography

Denise Cocquerillat (8 June 1918, Granville - 18 December 1999, Paris) was a French archaeologist and Assyriologist, specialist in cuneiform texts.

== Biography ==
She studied at the École du Louvre and passed a thesis (“The Mace in Mesopotamian Iconography”) on 22 December 1947 with Georges Contenau and André Parrot as members of the jury.

She also studied ancient languages, such as Hebrew, Assyrian-Babylonian and Sumerian. She then devoted herself to the translation of cuneiform texts and became director of research at the French National Centre for Scientific Research.

Denise Cocquerillat has dealt with about 10% of the 1500 published Neo-Babylonian tablets from Uruk and the legal texts of Babylon dating from the second millennium BC.

Until the end of her life and long after her retirement, Denise Cocquerillat was passionate about the civilizations of the Ancient Near East, continuing to take courses, not missing any exhibition in this field and very attached to the transformations of the rooms of the Oriental Antiquities of the Louvre Museum.

— Agnes Spycket

== Works ==
- Cocquerillat, Denise (1955). Les prébendes patrimoniales dans les temples à l'époque de la Ire dynastie de Babylone (in French).
- Cocquerillat, Denise (1967). Aperçus sur la Phéniciculture en Babylonie à l'époque de la 1^{e} dynastie de Babylone (in French). Brill.
- Cocquerillat, Denise (1968). Palmeraies et cultures de l'Eanna d'Uruk 559-520 (in French). Mann.
- Cocquerillat, Denise (1973). Recherches sur le verger du temple campagnard de l'Akitu (in French). Vandenhoeck und Ruprecht.
- Cocquerillat, Denise (1981). "Compléments aux " Palmeraies et cultures de l'Eanna d'Uruk "(I)". Revue d'Assyriologie et d'archéologie orientale. 75 (2): 151–169. ISSN 0373-6032. JSTOR 23282327.
- Cocquerillat, Denise (1984). "Compléments aux " Palmeraies et cultures de l'Eanna d'Uruk " (II): L'aménagement de la campagne d'Uruk et son peuplement avant l'époque des Fermes générales (VIII e -VI e siècle av. J.-C.)". Revue d'Assyriologie et d'archéologie orientale. 78 (1): 49–70. ISSN 0373-6032. JSTOR 23282400.
