= Nectanebo =

Two pharaohs of ancient Egypt's 30th dynasty shared the name Nectanebo:

- Nectanebo I (ruled 380 to 362 BC)
- Nectanebo II (ruled 360 to 343 BC)
