= Temple of Montu (Medamud) =

Egyptian temple near Karnak, Luxor, Egypt

Coordinates: 25°44′3.26″N 32°42′36.62″E

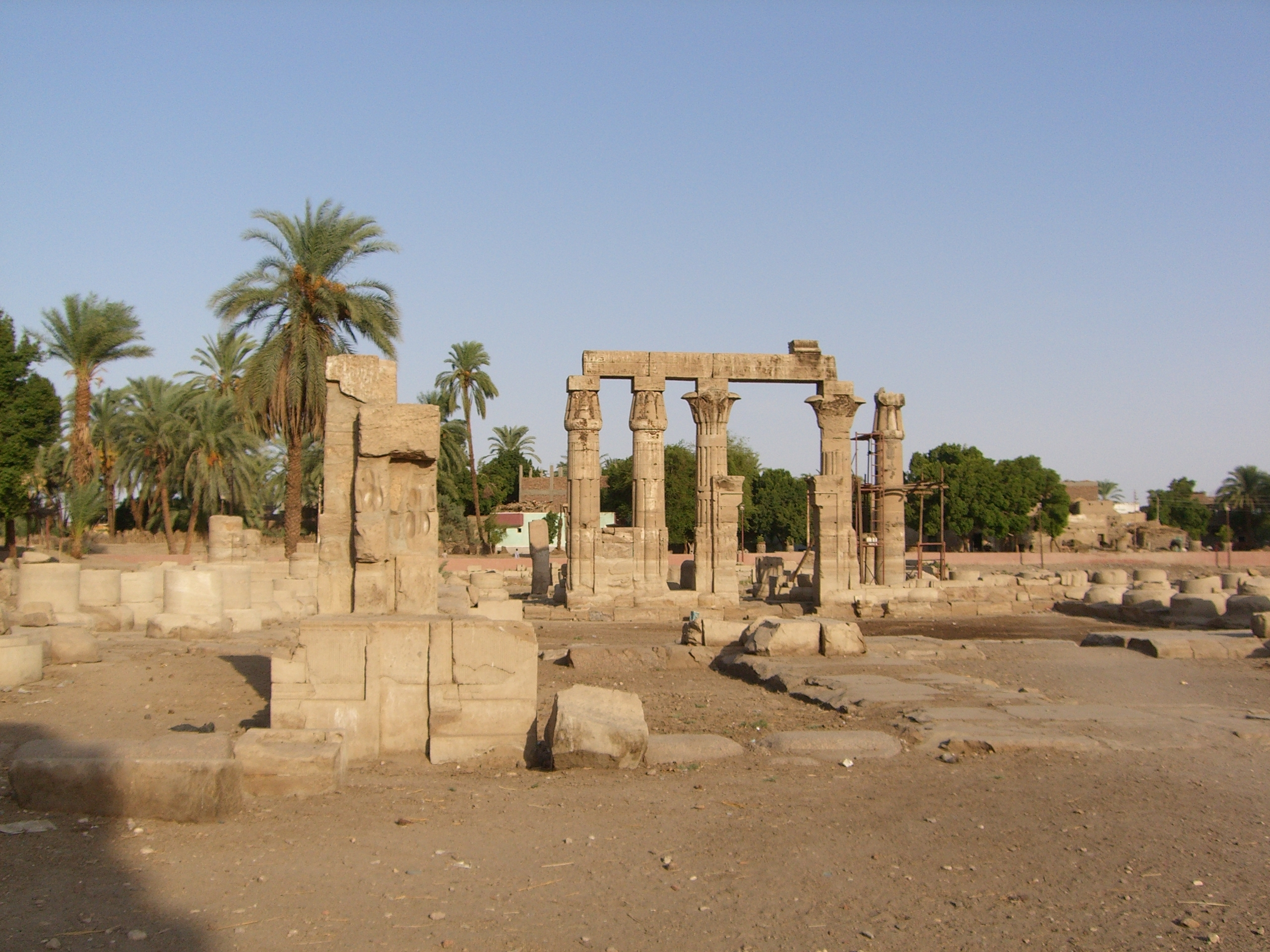
Temple of Montu in Medamud

The Temple of Montu (also Temple of Monthu, Montju, or Menthu) is an Egyptian temple dedicated to the worship of Montu. The site is located 5 kilometres (3.1 mi) northeast of Karnak, which is located within Luxor. Medamud was excavated by French archaeologist Fernand Bisson de la Roque from 1925 to the post-war, and revealed many buildings including a temple dedicated to Montu. This temple replaced an ancient sanctuary and consists of an open forum with a tower and enclosing two mounds that housed the chapels of worship. It is thought that the original sanctuary dates to the Old Kingdom. The ruins of the last structure date to the Ptolemy VIII period of the 2nd century BC, although decorations and additions continued to be added centuries later by the Romans. Because of Montu's strong association with raging bulls, the temple was a major center of worship for bulls, containing many statues of bulls for worship and reliefs. Most of these statues are now located in various museums around the world.

== Montu ==
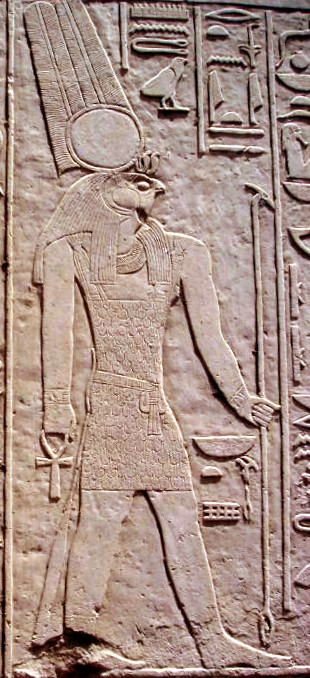
Relief of Montu in Medamud

Montu was a falcon-headed god of war. He was the tutelary deity of Thebes. His consorts were Tjenenyet (or Tanen-t) and rˁỉ.t-tꜣ.wỉ ("female Ra of the Two Lands"); his son was Harpora. He is also associated with a sacred bull named Buchis.

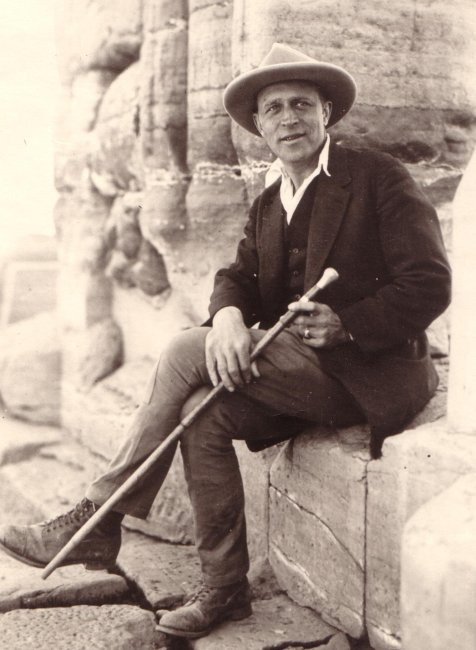
The temple's excavator, Fernand Bisson de la Roque.

In addition to the temple at Medamud, temples dedicated to Montu were built in Karnak, Armant, and Tod. From 1925-1932, the Medamud Temple of Montu was excavated by French archaeologist Fernand Bisson de la Roque of the Institut Français d'Archéologie Orientale in conjunction with the Louvre.

== Geography ==
Medamud (or Madu) was an outpost of Thebes, located 3 miles (4.8 km) away. Little is known about the town of Medamud or its other structures. Prior to construction of the Middle Kingdom temple, the site had been burned and earlier mounds were razed. The Middle Kingdom temple is situated on a circular mound, its orientation bearing east-west.

Nearby are the Egyptian temple complexes at Luxor and Karnak. The Karnak Temple Complex contains three precincts, including the Precinct of Montu, which contains another Temple of Montu.

== Old Kingdom site ==
The Old Kingdom temple site, dedicated to Montu, was walled and had a sacred grove. It had a tunnel system, mounds, and chambers.

== Middle Kingdom temple ==
The Middle Kingdom 12th Dynasty building is a rare example of the foundation of religion in the Middle Kingdom of Egypt era. Others of this period are the temple of Senwosret III in Abydos, the Temple of Medinet Madi and Qasr el-Sagha in Fayoum dating from approximately the same time, and the funerary temple of Mentuhotep II of the 11th dynasty in Deir el-Bahari. The sanctuary was remodeled in later periods.

The temple's features included a tribune platform, a canal, a ddromos, main gate, portico, hall, and sanctuary. There was also a courtyard for the living sacred bull. It consisted of a first chamber, 200 by 180 meters. The main access was by the east and north. A sacred lake was probably on the west side of the temple. The temple consisted of two distinct, contiguous sections that have been interpreted as a temple to the north and one to the south where the priests would have had their quarters. Typical of the period, the temple was built out of brick - it included raw elements for the doors and frames, and column or carved stone, the bases of which were decorated. Carved stone would have been present in the most intimate parts of the sanctuary, but no trace of it has been discovered. No doubt these parts were considered sacred and reused in later buildings. The plan of the sanctuary of the Middle Kingdom is still subject to discussion, but it was to have at least one hypostyle antechamber giving access to chapels of worship or shrine. A large courtyard surrounded by portico columns where a sacred bull would have lived would have been revered as the hypostasis of the living Montu.

This temple has provided many examples of royal statuary and lithic elements of Ancient Egyptian architecture. One of the extravagant doors, dated to Senwosret III, is in the Louvre. The temple continued to be decorated in the 13th Dynasty of Egypt, including Sobekhotep II, and included some reliefs of his predecessors and of his ancestor Senwosret III, dressed in the fashion of the Sed festival.

== New Kingdom temple ==
The temple was revised later by the kings of the 18th Dynasty of Egypt and was rebuilt by Thutmose III, who rebuilt the stone sanctuary and adorned it with statues in his likeness.

== Graeco-Roman temple ==
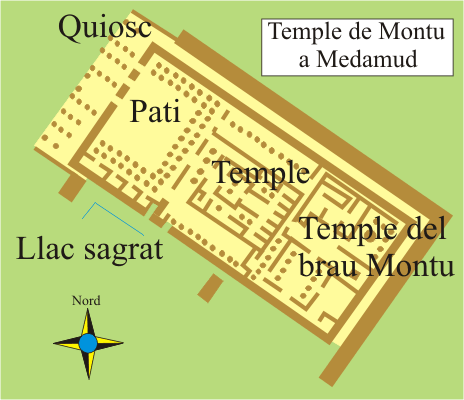
Plan of the Temple of Montu at Medamud

The site is currently closed to the public as a team of archaeologists and restorers work to protect against the modern city encroachment on the ancient remains of the former city.

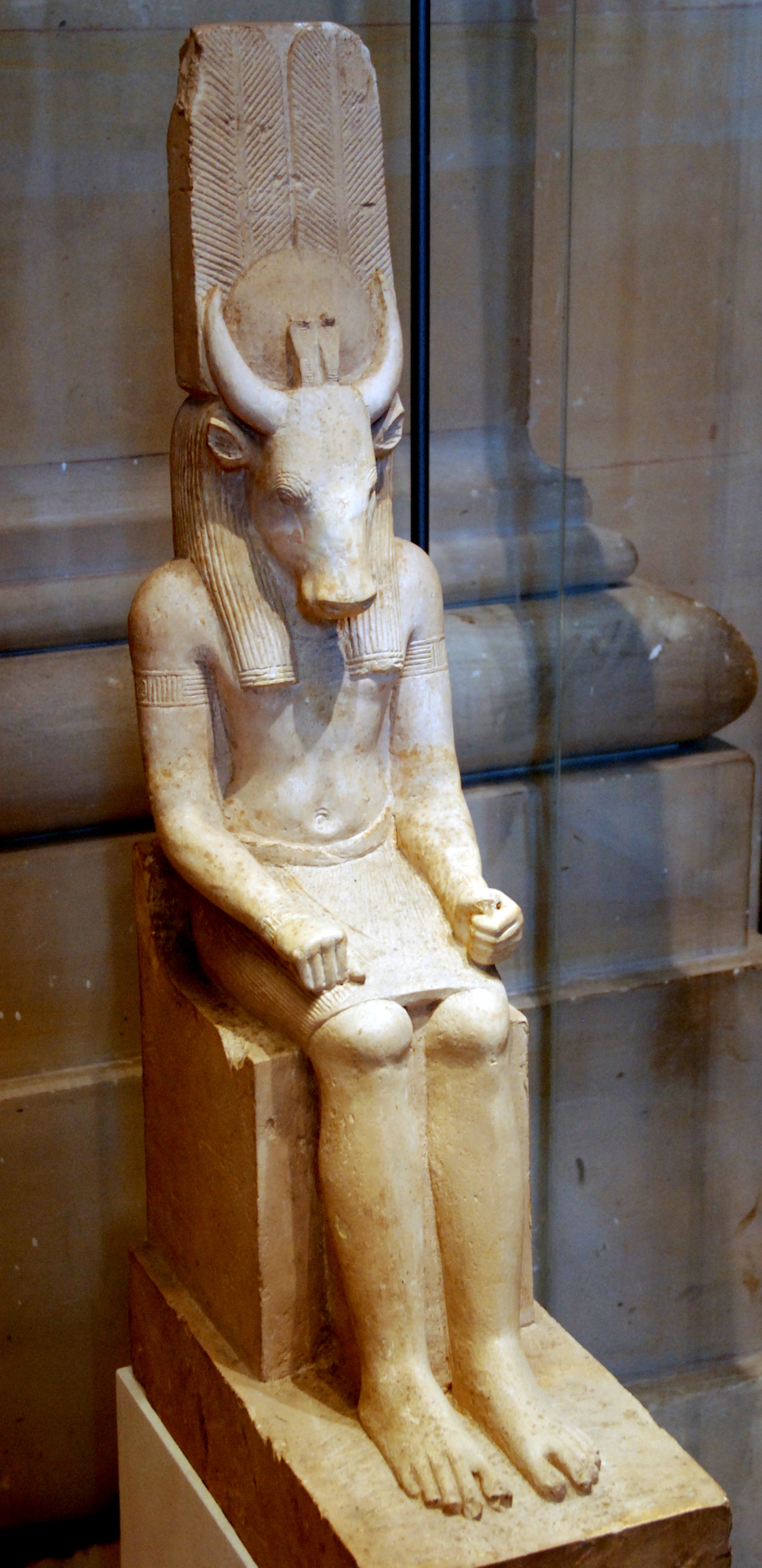
Montu depicted with a bull's head, from the Ptolemaic period (332 — 30 BC). On display in the Louvre, the statue was found in Medamud in the cell of the goddess Raet-Tawy.

Composed of twelve columns, the structure was built under Ptolemy VIII, who was then one of the great rebuilders of Medamud. Four of the six columns of the façade are still connected by walls. The elements of the inner temple are dated from the beginning of the Ptolemaic period. The enclosure of the temple included a sacred lake and a deep well but was blocked off because it represented a danger to children playing in the area. The temple continued to be enlarged and decorated for centuries under the Roman emperors, including Tiberius (14–37), up until the reign of Antoninus Pius. A wharf, which was reached by a canal, connected the temple with a line of sphinxes and is now in a state of ruin. Although grass grows throughout the site, there is evidence of ancient pilgrims in the form of graffiti or engraved footprints. Following the processional aisle, it was possible to access a large door whose decoration dates from the reign of Tiberius. This monumental gateway was a large opening within the walls of the temple axis. It was Ptolemy VIII who built the towered portico around the door, its decoration not completed until the reign of Ptolemy XII. Another door dates to Ptolemy II.

Some of the artifacts found in the temple date to Ptolemy III and Ptolemy IV. Many of these artifacts are statues of bulls used for worship and reliefs. The interior of this monument and its doors describe the traditional scenes of the Sed festival, when the king in traditional costume receives offerings or during an important step in the inauguration ceremony of royal power. The Temple of Montu is also an important insight into how very popular bull cults were in ancient Egypt, with Montu being strongly associated with raging bulls. A long corridor retained the scenes of the cult of the bull Buchis, which dates mostly from the emperor Domitian (81–96). There is also a wall relief of a procession of musicians who came to visit Trajan.

Nothing remains of the earlier or later temples, and the remains are dated mainly from the Greco-Roman period. The temple at Medamud was probably founded as the place of worship for the living god Montu while the temple Bouchéum (or Bucheum) at Ermant included a necropolis of sacred bulls, and was probably dedicated to his death. There are Coptic remains on the temple site.

== Museum exhibits ==
What could be removed from the original structure, parts of the building and artifacts, were taken to museums such as the Karnak Open Air Museum. Most of the temple's statues and the Gates to the Temple are now located in various museums, including the Museum of Fine Arts of Lyon and the Louvre.

== See also ==
- List of ancient Egyptian sites, including sites of temples
