= André Parrot =

French archaeologist (1901–1980)

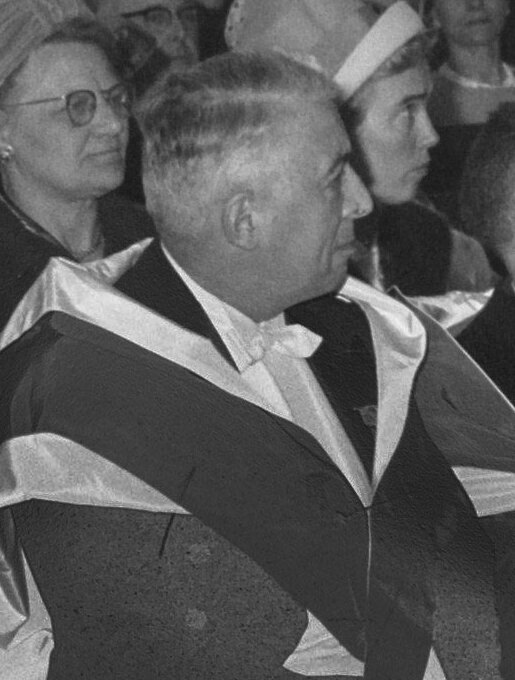
- Parrot in 1961
- Born: André Charles Ulrich Parrot; 15 February 1901; Désandans, Doubs, France
- Died: 24 August 1980 (aged 79); Paris, France
- Known for: Leading excavations in Mari, Syria from 1933 to 1975
- Spouses: Henriette Cazelles (m. 1929; died 1955); Marie-Louise Girod (m. 1960)
- Scientific career
- Fields: Archaeology; Ancient art history; Theology
- Workplaces: Protestant Faculty of Theology in Paris; École du Louvre; Louvre Museum; École Biblique

André Charles Ulrich Parrot (French: [ɑ̃dʁe paʁo]; 15 February 1901 – 24 August 1980) was a French archaeologist, Assyriologist, curator, and Lutheran pastor who served as the first president and director of the Louvre Museum in Paris from 1968 through 1972. A specialist in the ancient Near East, Parrot led excavations in Lebanon, Iraq and Syria, and is best known for his discovery of the city of Mari where he led important excavations from 1933 through 1975.

He was the husband of the composer Marie-Louise Girod.

== Biography ==
=== Early life and education ===
Parrot was born on 15 February 1901 in Désandans in the French department of Doubs to a Protestant family who professed belief in the Evangelical Lutheran Church in France. His father was Charles Gustave Georges Parrot (21 July 1869 – 9 December 1953) and his mother was Sophie Eugénie Plankenhorn, of German descent (4 April 1880 – 8 February 1938). His younger brother, Jean-Emmanuel Parrot, died ten days old (21 May 1905 – 31 May 1905), scarring the family.

Charles Parrot was a pastor from Montbéliard who preached in Héricourt aside from Désandans, and his son would likewise follow in his footsteps and become a pastor himself upon attaining his theology doctorate from the Protestant Faculty of Theology and Sorbonne University in Paris.

His fascination with Biblical history and theology soon expanded into archæology and studying ancient cultures, especially those in the Near-East. Parrot studied at the École Biblique in Jerusalem from 1926 through 1927, during which he participated in the excavations of Al-Nayrab which were supervised by Augustin Georges-Barrois and Bertrand Carrière.

It was also then he studied art history at the École du Louvre, where he would later be employed from 1937 through 1968.

=== First major digs ===
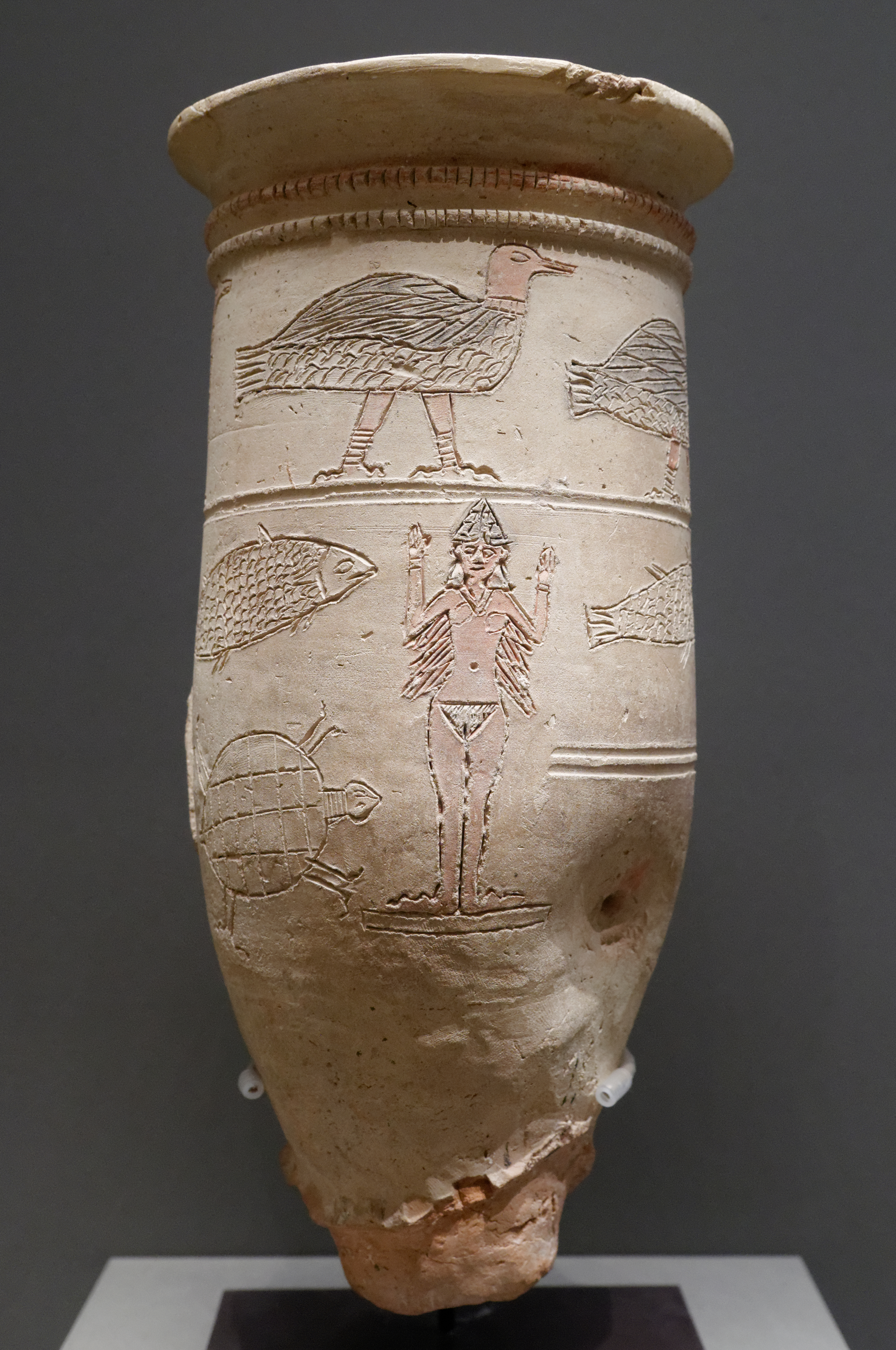
The Ishtar Vase, one of Parrot's most famous discoveries

Following successful digs and discoveries at Al-Nayrab and, later in 1928, at Byblos, Parrot was appointed to direct excavations at Baalbek. He was appointed deputy director of excavations at Lagash in 1930; the year later, he became its formal director, serving until 1933, when he resigned to oversee the archæological expedition in Larsa. There he unearthed the Ishtar vase, which dates to the second millennium BC and is displayed at the Louvre's Department of Oriental Antiquities.

=== Mari ===
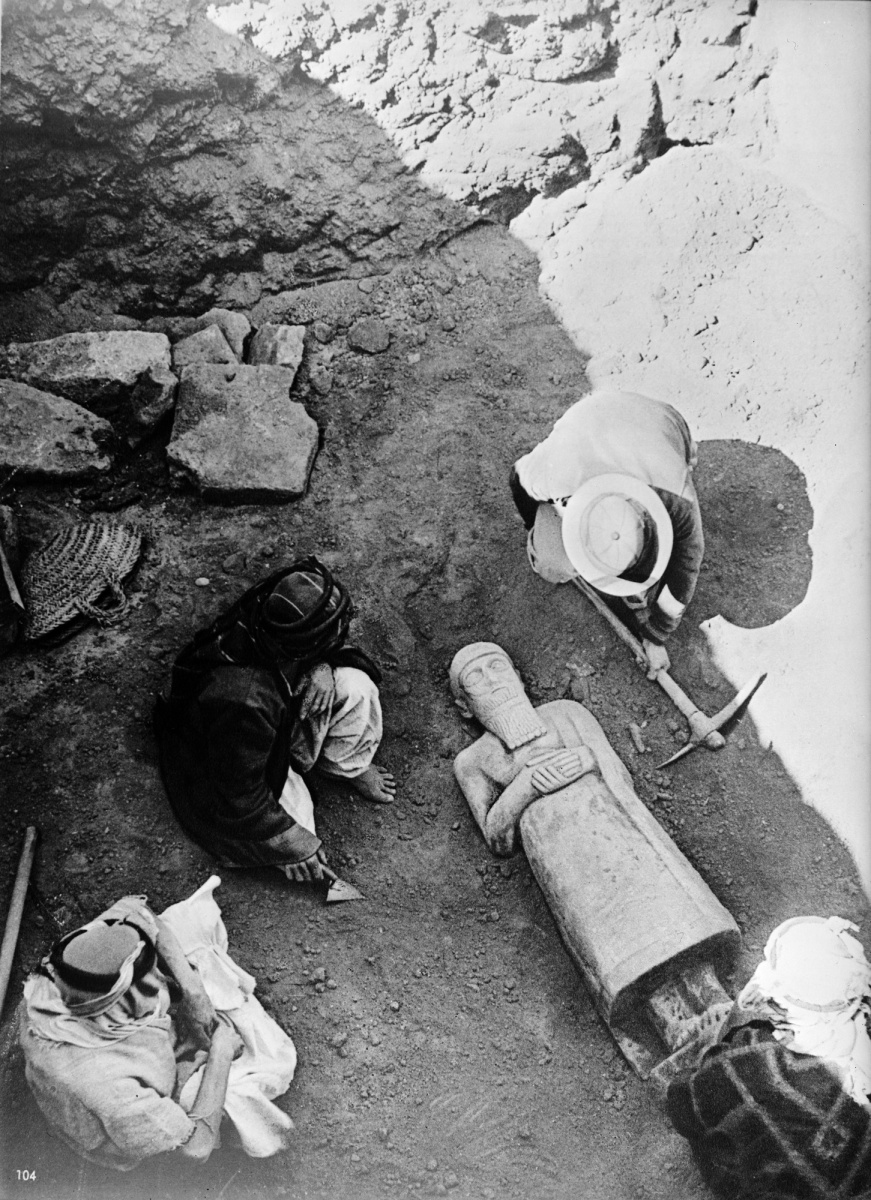
Parrot and his team discovering the statue of military governor Ishtup-Ilum during the 1936 Mari expedition

=== Curation ===
He was appointed chief curator of the National Museums in 1946, and became director of the Louvre from 1958 to 1962. He was a Commander of the Legion of Honour and a member of the Académie des Inscriptions et Belles-Lettres. He married his second wife Marie-Louise Girod in 1960, and died in Paris in 1980.

One of his students at the École du Louvre was Denise Cocquerillat. When he was mobilised in 1940, he was replaced as a teacher at the École du Louvre by Marguerite Rutten.

=== Personal life ===
His first wife was Henriette Charlotte Antoinette Cazelles (born 11 April 1909), whom he married on 8 July 1929 in the sixteenth arrondissement of Paris; together, they had five children: Jean-Marc, Marion, Marion Françoise (deceased), Christian, and Annick. She died on 3 December 1955.

On 30 July 1960, he married the composer Marie-Louise Henriette Girod, who served as titular organist of the Oratoire du Louvre. Girod also shared his Lutheran faith and they practised their faith together.

=== Death ===
Parrot died at the age of 79 on 24 August 1980 in the fifth arrondissement of Paris, survived by Girod and some of his children.

== Bibliography ==
- Mari, a lost city (1936)
- Mesopotamian Archaeology (1946–1953)
- The Temple of Jerusalem (1957)
- Sumer (1960)
- Assur (1961)
- Abraham and His Times (1962, Oxford UP)
- The Treasure of Ur (1968)
- The Art of Sumer (1970)
- The excavations of Mari, 18th and 19th campaigns (1970–1971)
- Mari, fabulous capital (1974)
- Les Phéniciens: L'expansion phénicienne; Carthage (Paris: Gallimard, 1975)
- Archaeology (1976) (ISBN 2-228-89009-X)
- Archaeological Adventure (1979) (ISBN 2-221-00392-6)
