= Georges Contenau =

French archeologist, curator, orientalist and historian (1877-1964)

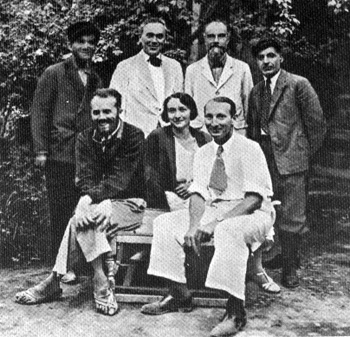
- Tepe Sialk in 1934: seated from right to left: Roman Ghirshman, Tania Ghirshman, Georges Contenau.
- Born: 9 April 1877; Laon
- Died: 22 March 1964 (aged 86); Paris
- Occupation(s): Physician; Archaeologist; Historian

Georges Contenau (April 9, 1877 – March 22, 1964) was a French archeologist, curator, orientalist and religious historian who was an expert in the field of culture and religion of the ancient civilizations of the Near and Middle East.

== Life ==
Contenau was professor at the University of Brussels from 1932 to 1947. He was chief curator of Oriental antiquities - in French the Département des Antiquités orientales - at the Musée du Louvre from 1927 to 1946. He led several archaeological expeditions to Susa, Sidon and Nahavand. From 1946 to 1957 he was director general of the French Archaeological Mission in Iran.

He wrote about the civilization of the Babylonians and Assyrians (1922), their daily life (1950), their Magic (1947) and divination (1940). He also wrote on the Phoenicians (1926), Hittite and Hurrians (1948). He issued a four-volume Handbook of Oriental Archaeology (1927–1947) and commenced the publication of the Encyclopédie d'archéologie orientale (1914–1957).

One of his students at the École du Louvre was Denise Cocquerillat and his assistant was Marguerite Rutten.

== Some publications ==
- L'Art de l'Asie occidentale ancienne, Paris, éd. G. van Oest, 1928
- les civilisations des Hittites et des Mitanniens, Paris, 1934
- La Civilisation d'Assur et de Babylone, Paris, 1937
- La Médecine en Assyrie et en Babylonie, Paris, 1937, 2de éd. 1951
- La Divination chez les Assyriens et les Babyloniens, 1940
- La Vie quotidienne à Babylone et en Assyrie, Paris, 1950 (translated into several languages)
- Les religions de l'Orient ancien, 1957
- Les civilisations anciennes du Proche-Orient, Paris, éd. Presses Universitaires de France, coll. Que sais-je ?, 1960
- Liste des ouvrages de Contenau traduits en allemand (in German)
