= Medamud =

Village in Luxor Governorate, Egypt

Medamud المدامود
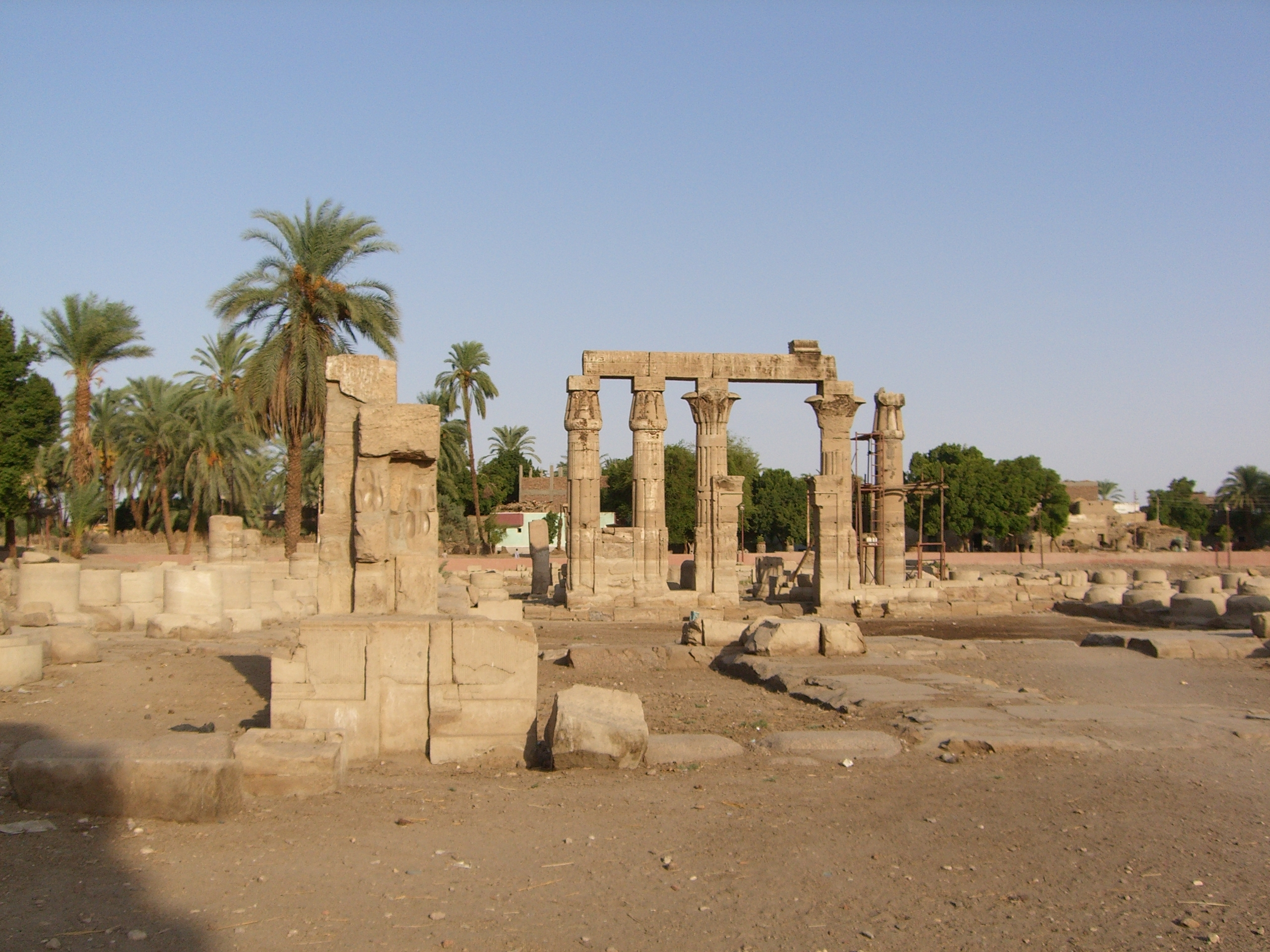
- View of the ruins of the Temple of Montu at Medamud dating to the Ptolemaic and Roman period.

- Location within Egypt
- Coordinates: 25°43′N 32°39′E
- Country: Egypt
- Governorate: Luxor

Population (2006)
  - Total: 15,091

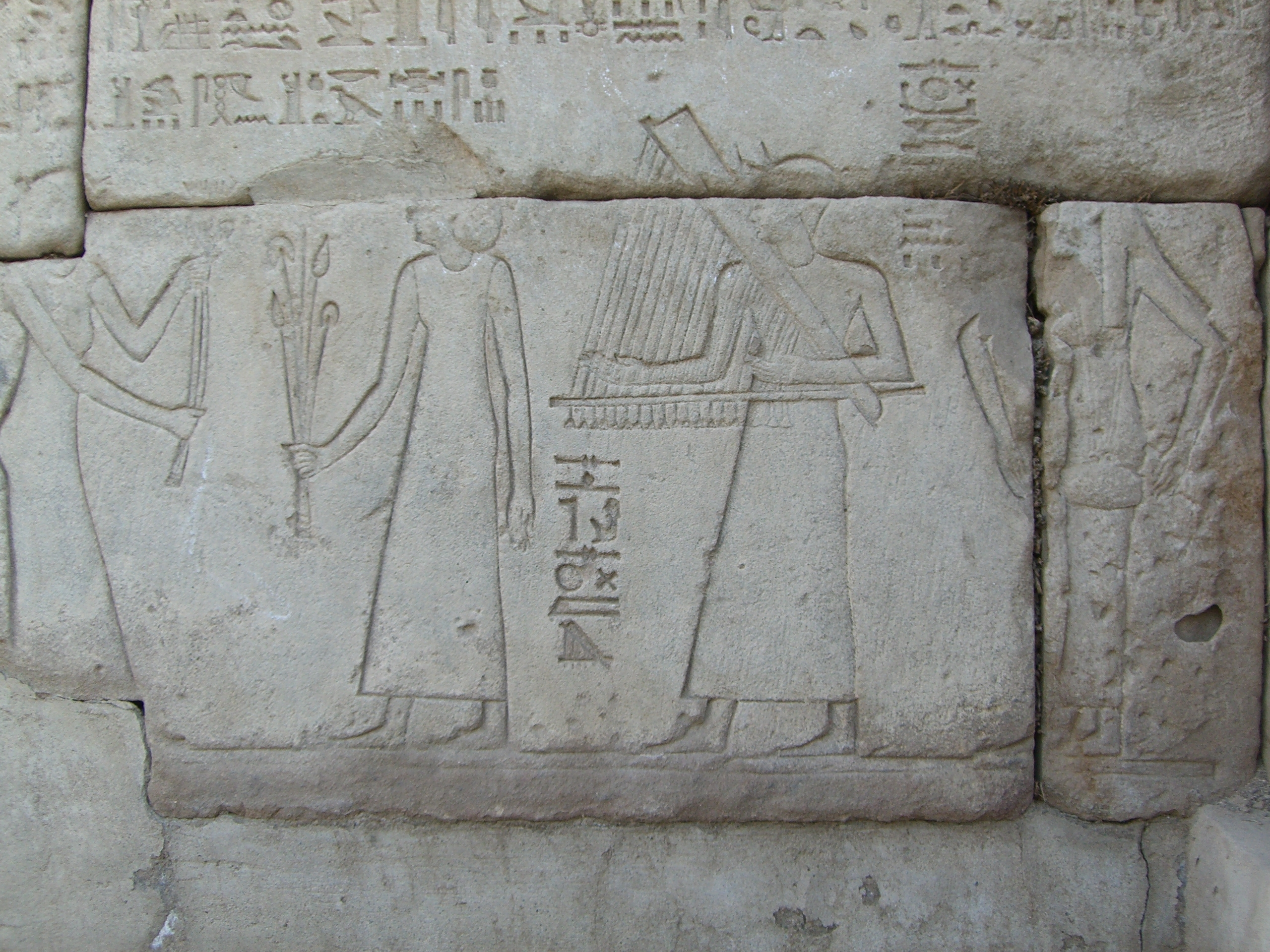
Relief of the wall of Trajan representing a procession of singers and musicians in the honor of the Monthu at Medamoud.

Medamud (Arabic: المدامود, from Coptic: ⲡⲉⲧⲉⲙⲟⲩⲧ) is a village in the Luxor Governorate of Egypt, about 8 km east-north from Luxor.

The Temple of Montu was located here. It was excavated by Fernand Bisson de la Roque in 1925, who identified several structures dedicated to the war-god Montu.

== Temple of Montu ==
See article Temple of Montu.

A simple Temple of Montu existed here already towards the end of the Old Kingdom, or during the First Intermediate Period. It was surrounded by a wall. It is now located below the present temple.

There were two pylons, one behind the other and, beyond them, there was a double cave sanctuary, the underground chambers of which were marked with mounds on the surface. These mounds of earth probably functioned as 'primeval mounds'.

During the Middle Kingtdom's 12th Dynasty, the old temple was completely rebuilt on a bigger scale.

Further building and renovation continued well into the time of the Roman Empire.

== See also ==
- List of ancient Egyptian sites
