= Tjenenyet =

Ancient Egyptian goddess of childbirth

Name in hieroglyphs
T M22 M22 t
- Major cult center: Hermonthis
- Parents: Amun and Mut
- Consort: Montu
- Offspring: Harpara, Iunit, Ra, Montu

Tjenenyet, alternatively Tenenet, Tjenenet, Zenenet, Tanenet, Tenenit, Manuel de Codage transliteration Tnn.t, was an ancient Egyptian goddess of childbirth and protection. She is mentioned in texts dating from the Ptolemaic period as well as in the Book of the Dead.

== Family ==
The goddess Tjenenyet is referred to as the daughter of Amun and Mut in a text from Armant. She was worshipped as the consort of the falcon-headed god Montu since the 11th dynasty. Both were once considered the parents of Harpara, a synchretized child form of the deities Ra and Horus. One text from Edfu claims that the goddess Iunit "resembles her mother who created her" which may indicate that Tjenenet was viewed as her mother.

== Historical origins ==
Tjenenyet was a local deity whose presence is primarily attested from the Middle Kingdom to the Ptolemaic and Roman periods. Her earliest references dates to the village of Tod, where she is described as "the goddess Tjenenyet, the one who resides in Tod." Her name could be the imperfective participle from the ancient Egyptian verb tni ("to lift up"). Her name could therefore be translated as "the exalted one".

During the New Kingdom, Raet-tawy was the primary consort of Montu in Karnak, Medamud, and Tod, while Tjenenyet and Iunit were worshipped in Armant. Despite Tjenenyet's importance in Armant, Raet-tawy also held a prominent role in Tod and was particularly significant in the Mammisi of Armant, known as "the temple of Raet-tawy." Both goddesses were linked to different local forms of Montu: Raet-tawy to of Montu-Ra, local to Thebes, and Tjenenyet to Montu-Ra-Horakhty, local to Armant.

In Thebes, the goddess is also part of the Theban Ennead. The Theban version of the Ennead consists of 15 members unlike the Ennead of Heliopolis, which was a grouping of nine deities. In addition to the gods of Heliopolis, several other deities from the Theban region were included, such as Montu, Horus, Hathor, Sobek, Tjenenyet, and Iunit. Here, too, the number and names of the members are not canonically fixed; rather, there is a degree of variation. Amun and Amunet are occasionally included but are usually considered to stand outside the Ennead.

She was later merged with Raet-Tawy, Isis and Iunit.

== Mythological roles ==
=== Creator and mother goddess ===
Tjenenyet is depicted as a powerful creator goddess and maternal figure. She is referred to as the "mother of mothers," "mother of the gods," and "divine mother who birthed the gods," with a specific connection to Ra as the "divine mother of Ra." In Armant, a Ptolemaic priest held the title "he who contents the mother of Montu, Tjenenet." Other epithets are "the ancestress of gods and goddesses" and "the sparkling egg that emerged from Nun." She is also called "the great Neith who initiated pregnancy" and "the cow of the great ones of the First Primeval time, uniting with her husband as a bull." Tjenenyet was associated with childbirth and was invoked as the protector of the uterus for pregnant women.

Tjenenyet may also be referenced in a Theban creation myth known as the "Khonsu Cosmogony," which is located in the main temple of the god Khonsu within the Karnak temple complex. In this myth, the syncretic deity Ptah-Tatenen-Khonsu ejaculates "towards this womb in the sea," which was created within the tnn.t-chapel. The Egyptologist Mendel, in his translation, proposes the theory that this chapel could symbolize Tjenenet herself, representing the primordial land. The "womb of the sea" is an epithet associated with Mut and Raet-tawy as maternal figures, and possibly with Neith. Khonsu impregnates a feminine entity within the primordial waters to bring forth the primordial egg.

=== Sun goddess ===
Tjenenyet, like other solar goddesses, adopted epithets commonly associated with Hathor and Tefnut, such as "Daughter of Ra" and "Eye of Ra, Lady of Heaven, Mistress of All the Gods." She is frequently depicted as "the uraeus of Ra," "the great serpent on Horakhty's brow, a golden flame illuminating the land," or "the flame of light creating illumination." Most vividly, she is described as "the greatest of gods and goddesses who heals Ra by ascending as a uraeus to unleash fiery breath upon his enemies." In her role as an apotropaic uraeus, Tjenenet was vital in protecting Ra, earning titles like "agent of Ra, who burns the flesh of his foes."
