= Hemen =

Ancient Egyptian god

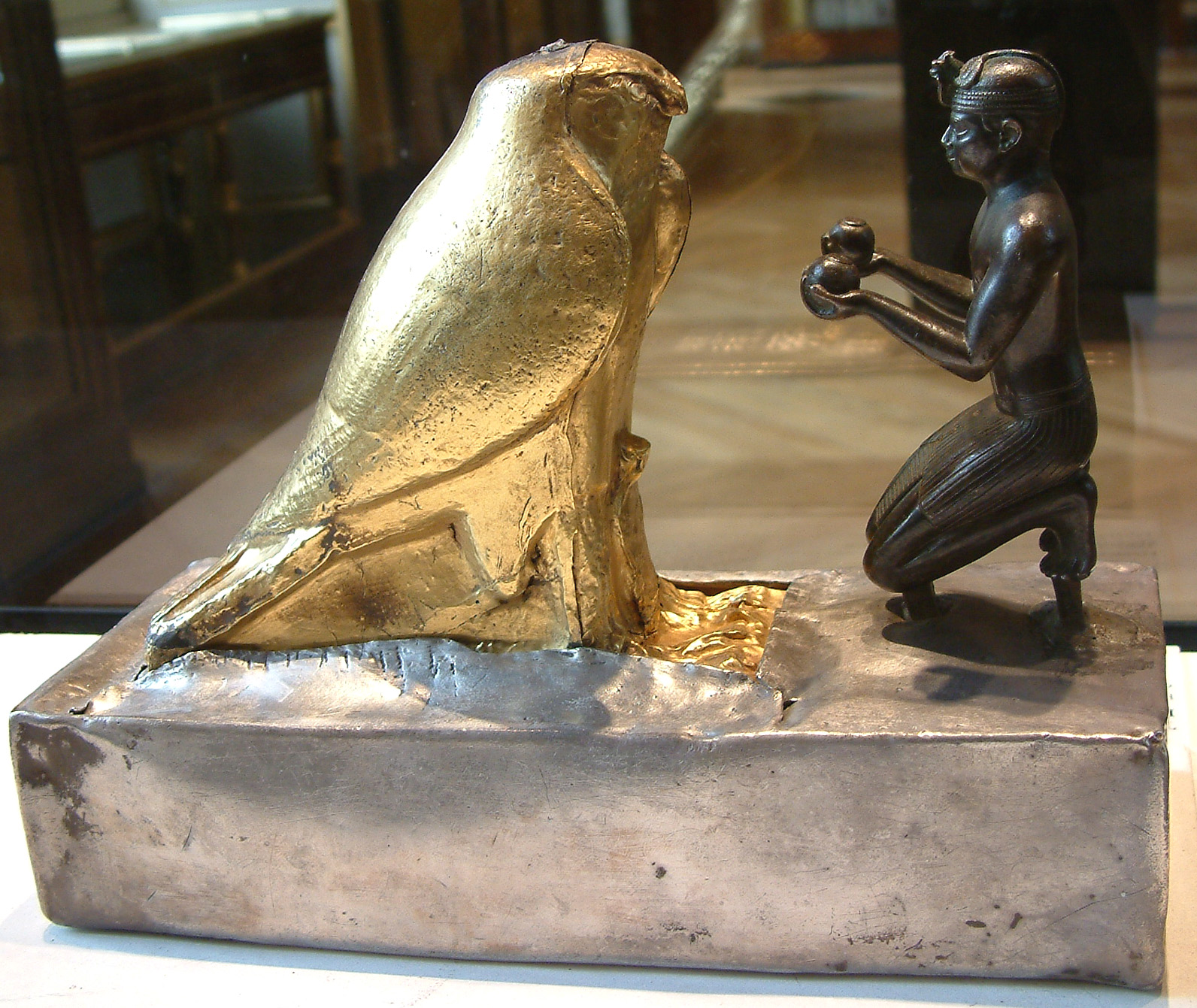
- Taharqa offering before Hemen. Statue from the Louvre.
Name in hieroglyphs
H mn n G11
- Symbol: Falcon

Hemen is a falcon god in the Ancient Egyptian religion.

== Places of worship ==
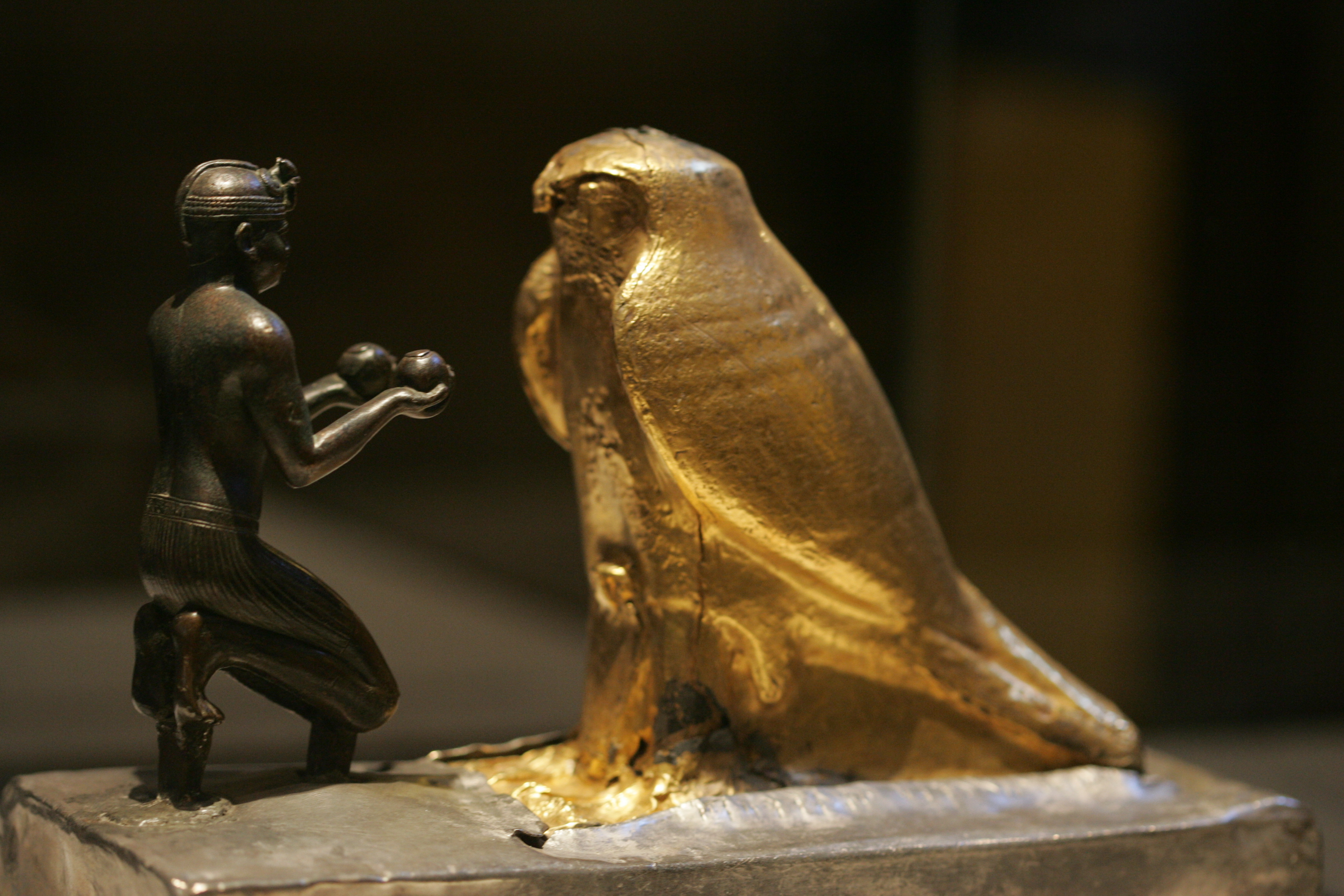
Different perspective showing Hemen in more detail.

Often worshipped as a divine entity unified with Horus, as Horus-Hemen lord of Asphynis or Horakhte-Hemen of Hefat. Flinders Petrie refers to Hemen as a god of Tuphium. Hemen is also used for the name of a town of ancient Egypt (as mentioned by Flinders Petrie during his studies of Abydos).

== Some examples of artifacts containing references to Hemen ==
Hemen is mentioned in a limited number of inscriptions and texts. Some of these include:

- In the Pyramid Texts, Utterance 231.
- Ankhtifi, a nomarch (= provincial governor) dated to the First Intermediate Period, is shown inspecting a fleet, killing a hippopotamus in Hefat during festivities and offering the hippopotamus to Hemen.
- A round-topped stela from the 13th dynasty invokes Ptah-Sokari-Osiris and Horus-Hemen lord of Asphynis. The stela was formerly in the V. Golenishchev collection, but is now in Moscow, in the State Pushkin Museum of Fine Arts.
- The chief sculptor Userhat who lived at the end of the 18th dynasty/beginning 19th dynasty mentions "causing cult statues to rest in their shrine". Hemen of Hefat is one of the gods listed among those Userhat was responsible for.
- Statue from the time of Amenhotep III; Now in Avignon, Musée Calvet.
- In the 22nd dynasty Hemen of Hefat is mentioned as an oracle. A man named Ikeni appears before Hemen in Hefat and the god says "Ikeni is right! He paid (etc.)".
- The 25th dynasty pharaoh Taharqa is shown before the god Hemen in a statue which is now in the Louvre.
- In ca. 300 BC Hemen's cult is still active as attested by an inscription of an official named Hornefer.
- In the Griffiths Institute listing: A stone object with Hemen possibly hawk-headed showing text of Amenophis III ‘beloved of Hemen lord of the sed-festival’.

== See also ==
- Hauron
- Sed festival
