= El-Tod =

Town and archaeological site in Egypt

- Tuphium طود
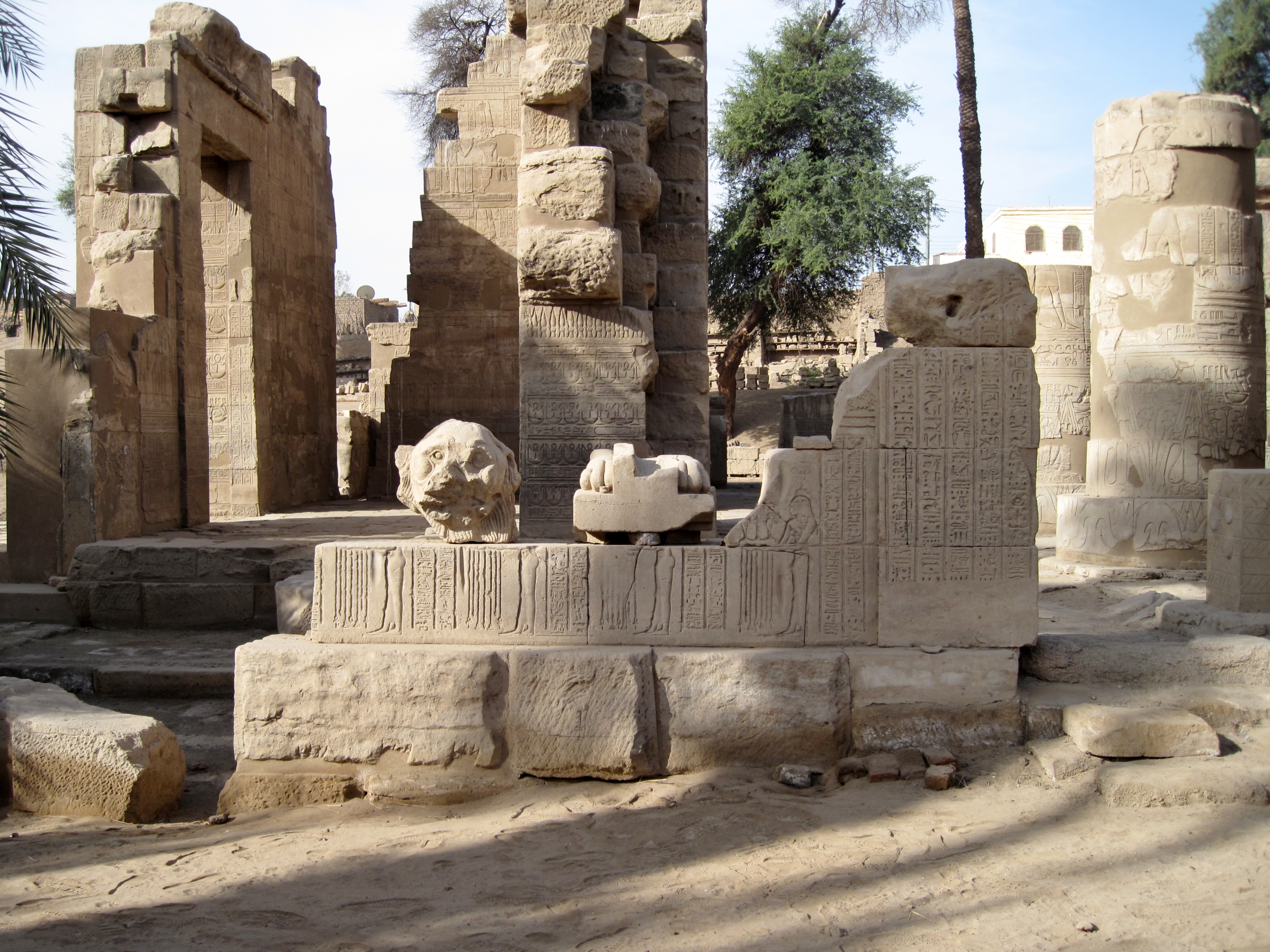
- Northeastern side of the Ptolemaic pronaos of the Temple of Montu in El-Tod

- Location within Egypt
- 25°34′59″N 32°32′1″E
- Type: Settlement
- Location: Luxor Governorate, Egypt
- Region: Upper Egypt

Dr r t y niwt
ḏrtj
in hieroglyphs

El-Tod (Arabic: طود aṭ-Ṭūd, from Coptic: ⲧⲟⲟⲩⲧ or ⲧⲁⲩⲧ, Ancient Egyptian: Ḏrty, lit. 'falcon', Ancient Greek: Τουφιον, Latin: Tuphium) was the site of an ancient Egyptian town and a temple to the Egyptian god Montu. It is located 20 kilometres (12 mi) southwest of Luxor, Egypt, near the settlement of Hermonthis. A modern village now surrounds the site.

== History ==
The history of the site can be traced to the Old Kingdom period of Egyptian history. A granite pillar of the Fifth dynasty pharaoh, Userkaf, is the oldest object found at El-Tod. It was this same pharaoh who ordered that the temple to Montu be enlarged. Evidence of Eleventh dynasty building is shown in the discovery of blocks bearing the names of Mentuhotep II and Mentuhotep III. Under Senwosret I, these buildings were replaced with a new temple. Further additions to this temple were made under Ptolemy VIII.

=== Culture ===
Aside from Montu, to whom a temple was dedicated, the Egyptian goddess Iunit was of local importance. According to Flinders Petrie, the god of Tuphium was Hemen. As part of the Thebaid, the area also saw the worship of Sebak (Sobek), the Egyptian crocodile god.

== Remains ==
On 7 March we visited the ruins of the ancient Tuphium, now Taoud situated on the right bank of the river but in the vicinity of the Arabic chain and very near to Hermonthis which is on the opposite bank. Here there are two or three little apartments of a temple, inhabited by Fellahs or their cattle. In the largest there are still some bas-reliefs, which informed me that the triad worshipped in the temple consisted of Mandou, the goddess Ritho, and their son Harphré, the same as in the temple of Hermonthis, the capital of the nome (district) to which Tuphium belonged.

— Jean-François Champollion,

=== List of Ruins ===
The archaeological site contains the ruins of a number of structures; including the main Ptolemaic period temple extension, Barque Shrine of Thutmose III, a dromos, part of the later north entrance, as well as an open air lapidarium.

=== Tod Treasure ===
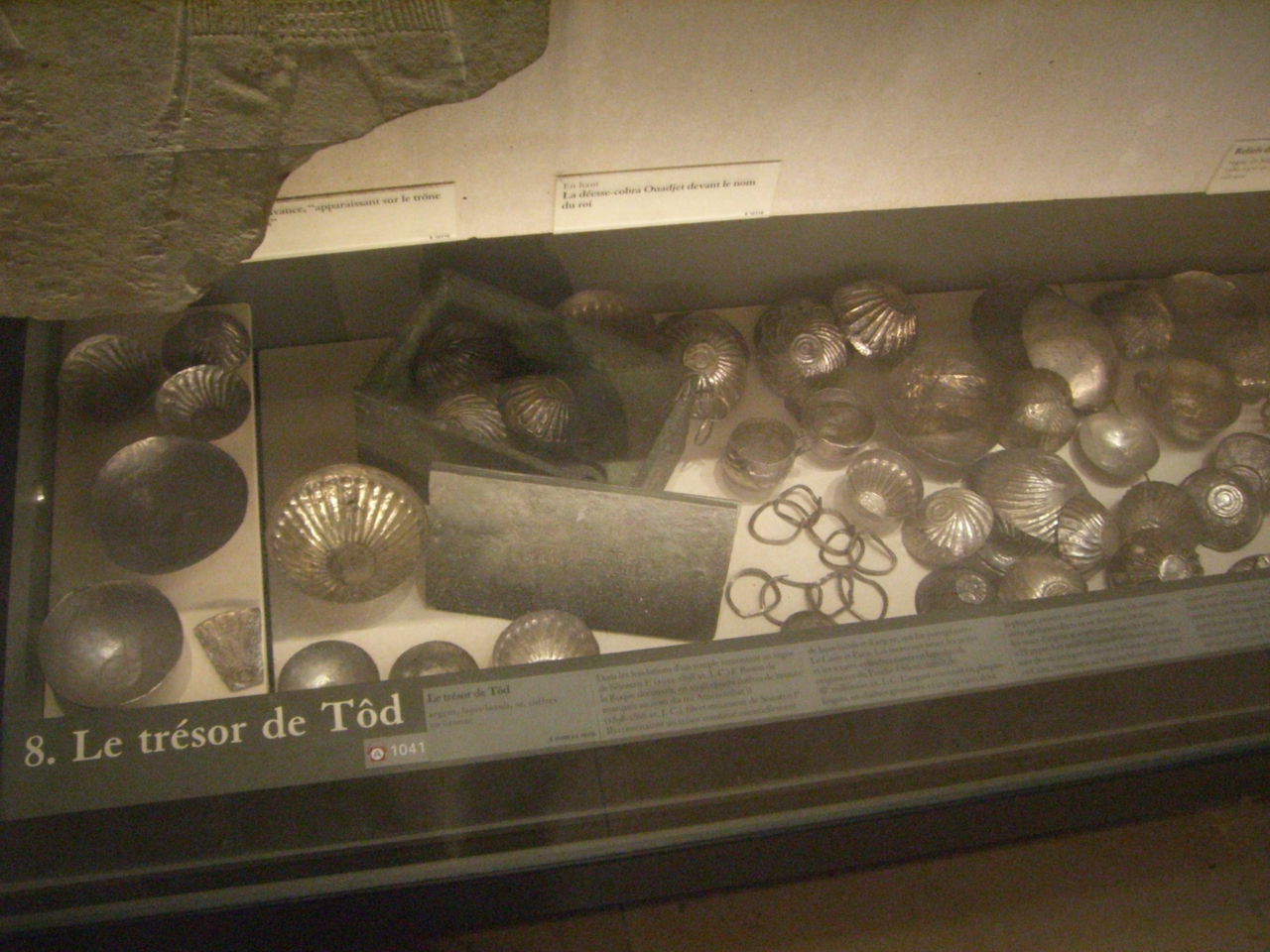
Tod Treasure on display at the Louvre

In 1936, archaeologists discovered in the support structures under the ruined temple building a number of metallic and lapis lazuli artifacts. Most of the metallic objects were made of silver. They were earmarked for some authorities of unknown origin and epoch, who are believed to have been of non-Egyptian origin. Nevertheless, the style of the objects resemble artifacts that were excavated in Knossos, which date to c. 1900–1700 BC. Yet, at Knossos such objects were made of clay, possibly imitating metal.

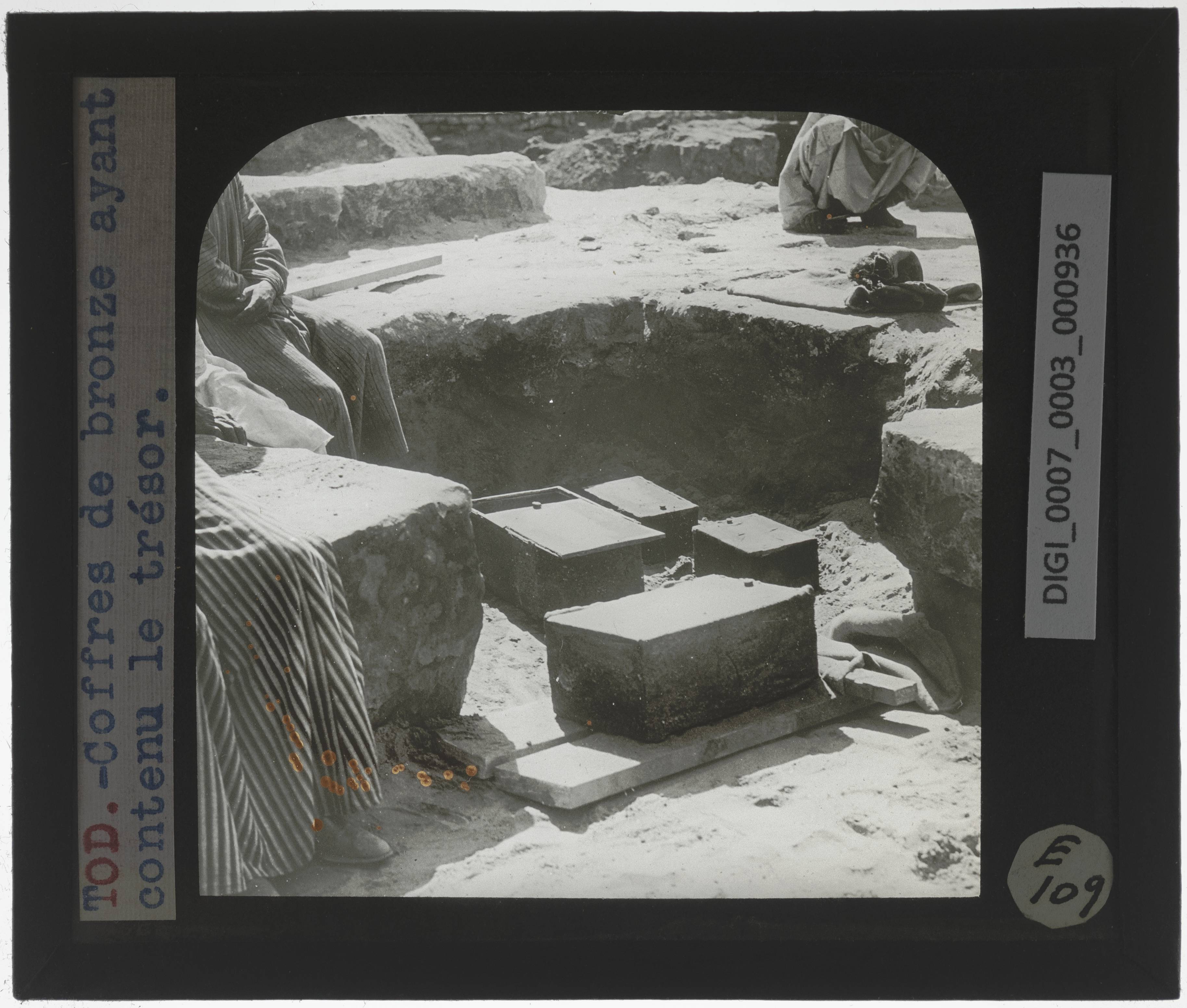
Four chests containing treasure of El-Tod.

The initial discovery of four chests (inscribed with the name of Pharaoh Amenemhat II) made of copper and containing the objects had been made by F. Bisson de la Roque. Some sources posit that the treasure is of Asiatic origin and that some of it, in fact, was manufactured in Iran (the latter as claimed by Roger Moorey). Some gold artifacts are also part of the Treasure, and they may have originated from Anatolia. A similar conclusion is drawn on the origin of the silverware based on evidence obtained from relative analysis of the metallic constituents.

Objects that were found as part of the Treasure seem to have originated from various parts of the world, indicating trade contacts between the Ancient Egyptians and other early civilizations.

The total weight of all gold items was 6.98 kg, and of the silver items 8.87 kg. After discovery, the Treasure was divided between the Louvre Museum and the Egyptian Museum.

== See also ==
- List of ancient Egyptian towns and cities
