= El Mo'alla =

Village in Luxor Governorate, Egypt

Coordinates: 25.4722°N 32.5250°E

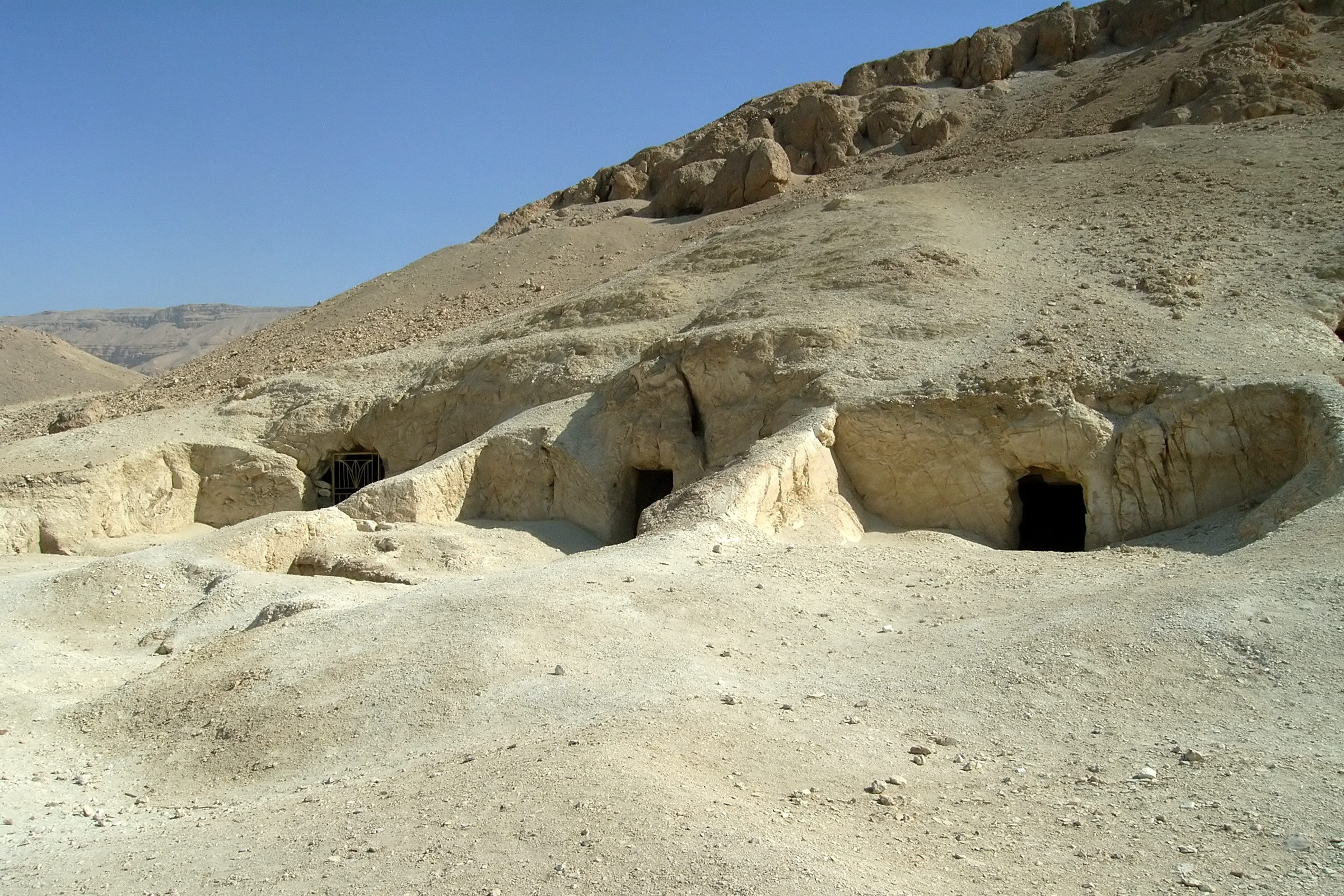
Rock-cut tombs at el-Mo'alla

El Mo'alla (Arabic: المعلّى) is a town in Upper Egypt located about 35 km south of Luxor, on the east bank of the Nile.

Known as Hefat by ancient Egyptians, it served as a necropolis for the nearby city of Djerty (nowadays El-Tod) since the early First Intermediate Period. Two rock-cut tombs within it, datable to this period, are particularly remarkable because of their decorations, that of the two nomarchs Ankhtifi and Sobekhotep.
