= Raet-Tawy =

Ancient Egyptian solar goddess

- Raet-Tawy, is often depicted as a Female Goddess wearing a headdress similar, or identical to Hathor.
Name in hieroglyphs
r a i i t ra
ra t tA tA
- Major cult center: Medamud, el Tod, Thebes
- Consort: Montu

Raet-Tawy or Raet is an ancient Egyptian solar deity, the female aspect of Ra. Her name is simply the female form of Ra's name; the longer name Raet-Tawy means "Raet of the Two Lands" (Upper Egypt and Lower Egypt).

== Name and origins ==
Mention of Raet occurs as early as the Fifth Dynasty. As her name is simply the feminine form of Ra, it is evident she did not exist independently of him. It is unclear when the fuller form of her name, Raet-tawy, was first used. She was later referred to as "lady of heaven, mistress of the gods", mirroring Ra's titles.

== Cult ==
Raet was also considered a wife of Montu, and she formed a triad with him and Harpocrates in Medamud. Her feast day was in the fourth month of the reaping season. The centers of her cult were at Medamud, El-Tod, and Thebes. A demotic manual from the Roman period with hymns to Raet has survived in fragments. She never reached the importance of Hathor, who by then was also considered the wife of Ra (or, in other myths, his daughter).

== Iconography ==
Images of Raet are rare. When she is depicted, she is shown as a woman with cow horns holding a sun disk on her head, similar to the headdress of Hathor. The headdress is adorned with a uraeus, or sometimes with feathers.
