= Iunit =

Minor goddess in ancient Egyptian religion

- Iunit is often depicted as a Female Goddess wearing a headdress similar, or identical to Hathor.
Name in hieroglyphs
iwn Z1 i i t H8 I12
- Major cult center: Armant

Genealogy
- Parents: Tjenenyet
- Spouse: Montu
- Offspring: Horus-Shu

Iunit was a minor goddess in ancient Egyptian religion, whose name means "She of Armant". She is the consort of Montu.
