= Ra =

Ancient Egyptian solar deity

- Ra-Horakhty, one of the many forms of Ra, god of the Sun, has the head of a falcon and the sun disk inside the Uraeus resting on his head.
Name in hieroglyphs
r a N5 Z1 C2
orN5 Z1 C2
orC2 N5
orC2
orN5
- Major cult center: Heliopolis but was worshipped everywhere in Ancient Egypt.
- Symbol: Sun Disk, Solar barque

Genealogy
- Parents: None (most accounts); Khnum and Neith (alternative sources); Hathor (In the cycle of rebirth); Mehet-Weret (some accounts)
- Siblings: Apep, Sobek and Serket (as son of Khnum and Neith)
- Consort: Hathor, Sekhmet, Bastet, Satet (in some myths)
- Offspring: Shu, Tefnut, Hathor, Sekhmet, Mafdet, Bastet, Satet, Anhur, Ma'at, Mut, Anat, Qetesh

Equivalents
- Greek: Helios

Ra (/rɑː/; Ancient Egyptian: 𓂋𓐰𓂝𓇳, romanized: rꜥ; also transliterated rꜥw, pronounced [ˈɾiːʕuw]; cuneiform: 𒊑𒀀 ri-a or 𒊑𒅀ri-ia; Phoenician: 𐤓𐤏, romanized: rʿ) or Re (Coptic: ⲣⲏ, romanized: Rē) was the ancient Egyptian deity of the Sun. By the Fifth Dynasty, in the 25th and 24th centuries BC, Ra had become one of the most important gods in ancient Egyptian religion, identified primarily with the noon-day Sun. Ra ruled in all parts of the created world: the sky, the Earth, and the Duat (underworld). He was believed to have ruled as the second pharaoh of Ancient Egypt, succeeding Ptah. He was the god of the Sun, order, kings and the sky.

Ra was portrayed as a falcon and shared characteristics with the sky-god Horus. At times, the two deities were merged as Ra-Horakhty, "Ra, who is Horus of the Two Horizons". When the god Amun rose to prominence during Egypt's New Kingdom, he was fused with Ra as Amun-Ra.

The cult of the Mnevis bull, an embodiment of Ra, had its center in Heliopolis and there was a formal burial ground for the sacrificed bulls north of the city.

All forms of life were believed to have been created by Ra. In some accounts, humans were created from Ra's tears and sweat, hence the Egyptians called themselves the "Cattle of Ra". In the myth of the Celestial Cow, it is recounted how humankind plotted against Ra and how he sent his eye as the goddess Sekhmet to punish them.

== Religious roles ==
=== Journey of the Sun ===
Ra on the solar barque on his daily voyage across the sky (𓇯), adorned with the sun-disk

According to Egyptian myth, when Ra became too old and weary to reign on Earth, he relinquished and went to the skies. As the Sun god, his duty was to carry the Sun across the sky on his solar barque to light the day. When the sun set and twilight came, he and his vessel passed through the akhet, the horizon, in the west, and traveled to the Duat (underworld). At times, the horizon has been described as a gate or door that leads to the Duat. There, he would have to sail on the subterrestrial Nile and crossed through the twelve gates and regions. Through the course of his underworld journey, he would transform into his Ram-headed form. Every night, Apophis would attack Ra in an attempt to stop the sun-boat's journey. After defeating the snake, Ra would leave the underworld, returning at dawn, lighting the day once again. He was said to have traveled across the sky in his falcon-headed form on the Mandjet Barque through the hours of the day, and then switch to the Mesektet Barque in his ram-headed form to descend into the underworld for the hours of the night.

=== Sun as a creator ===
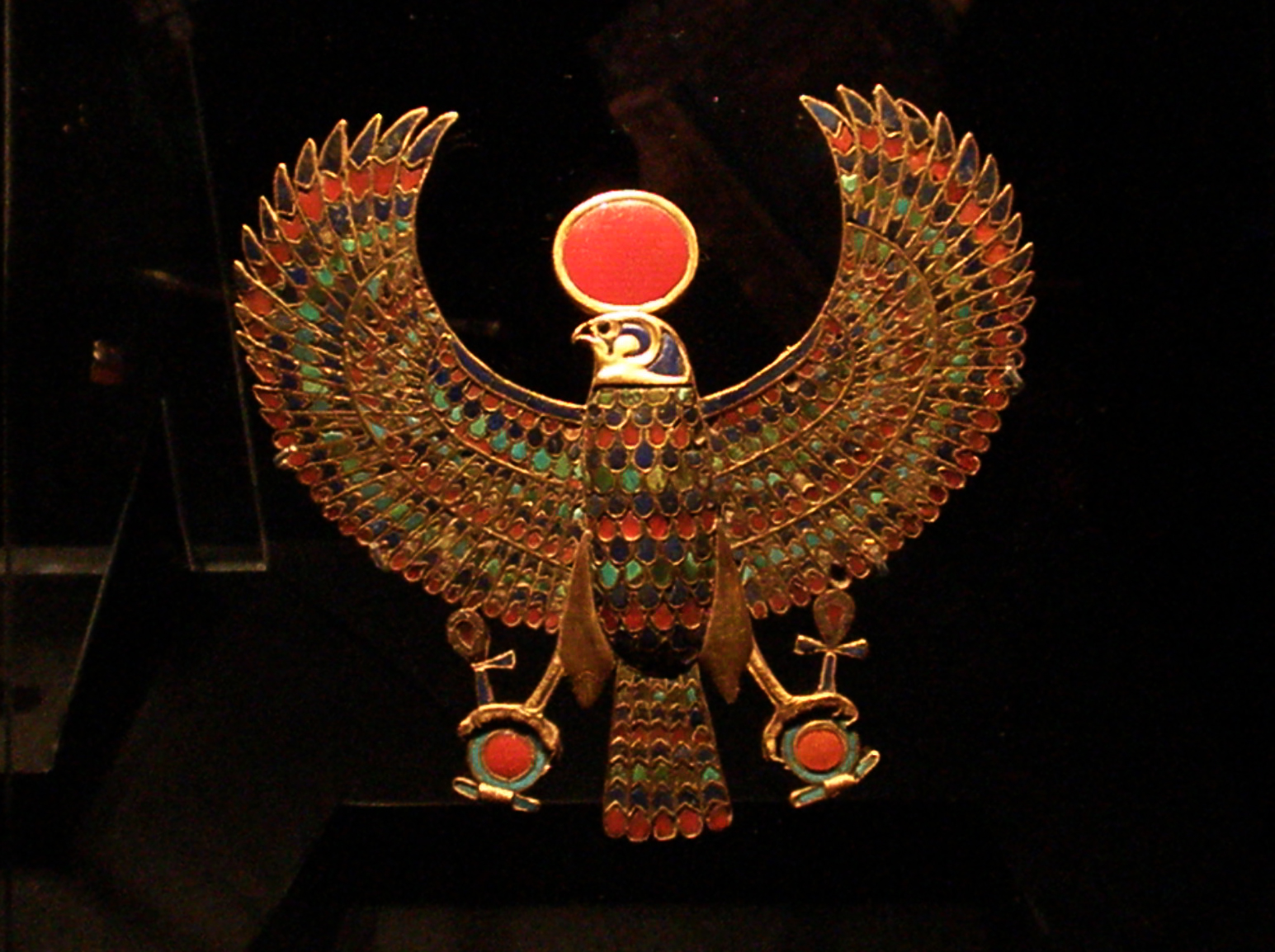
Jewelry of Ra as a falcon with spread wings, adorned with the sun-disk and holding the ankh, the hieroglyphic symbol of life

The Sun is the giver of life, controlling the ripening of crops that were worked by man. Because of the life-giving qualities of the Sun, the Egyptians worshipped the Sun as a god. The creator of the universe and the giver of life, the Sun or Ra represented life, warmth and growth. Since the people regarded Ra as a principal god, creator of the universe and the source of life, he had a strong influence on them, which led to him being one of the most worshipped of all the Egyptian gods and even considered King of the Gods.

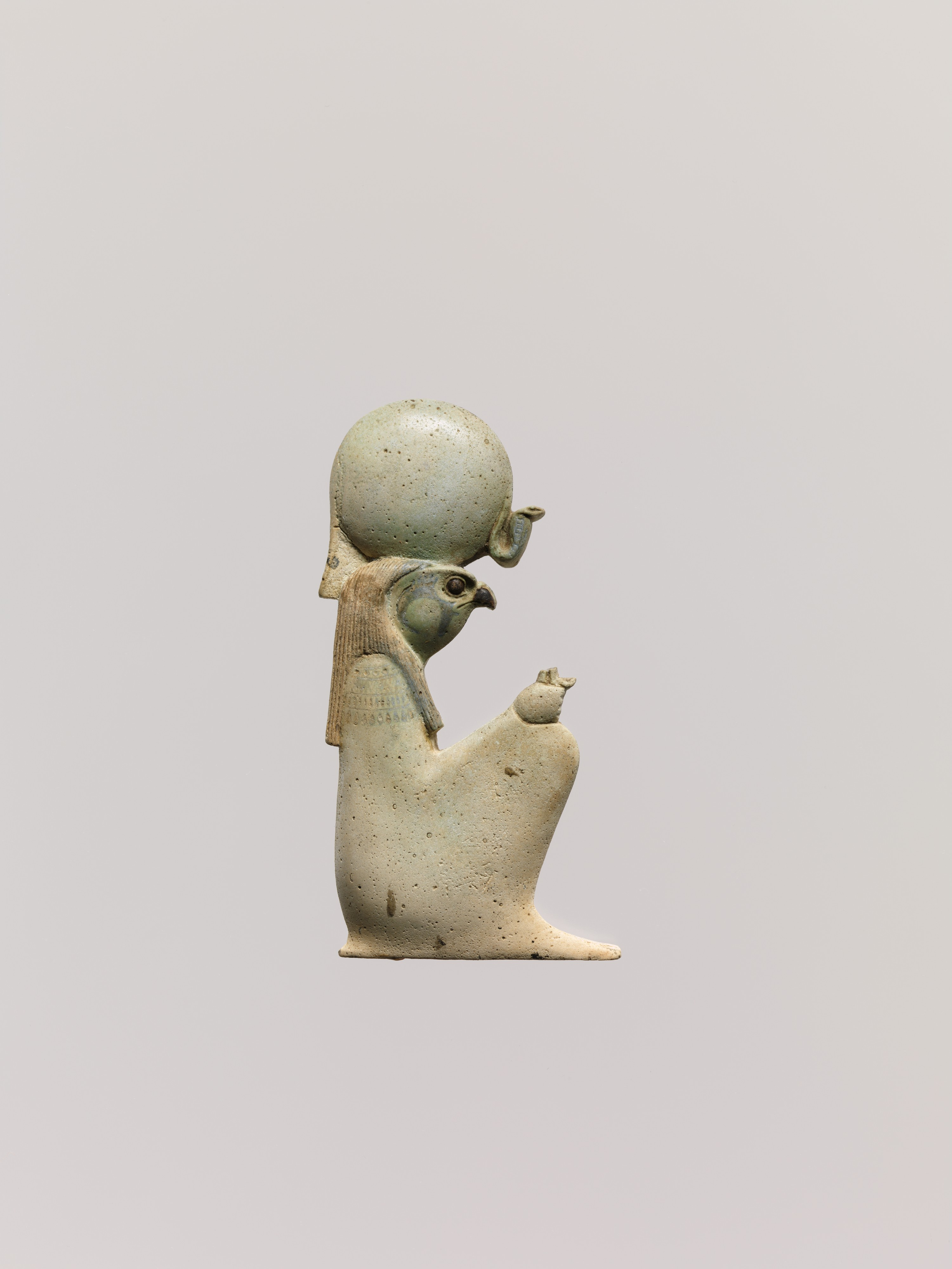
Inlay depicting the squatting Ra with the sun-disk placed atop his falcon head

At an early period in Egyptian history, his influence spread throughout the whole country, bringing multiple representations in form and in name. The most common form combinations are with Atum (his human form), Khepri (the scarab beetle) and Horus (the falcon). The form in which he usually appears is that of a man with a falcon's head, which is due to his combination with Horus, another sky-god. On top of his head sits a solar disc with a cobra, which in many myths represents the Eye of Ra. At the beginning of time, when there was nothing but chaos, the sun-god existed alone in the watery mass of Nun which filled the universe. The universe was enrapt by a vast mass of primordial waters, and the Benben, a pyramid mound, emerged amid this primal chaos. There was a lotus flower with Benben, and from this, when it blossomed, emerged Ra. "I am Atum when he was alone in Nun, I am Ra when he dawned, when he began to rule that which he had made." This passage talks about how Atum created everything in human form out of the chaos and how Ra then began to rule over the Earth where humans and divine beings coexisted. He created Shu, god of air, and the goddess of moisture, Tefnut. The siblings symbolized two universal principles of humans: life and right (justice). Ra was believed to have created all forms of life by calling them into existence by uttering their secret names. In some accounts humans were created from Ra's tears and sweat.

=== In the underworld ===
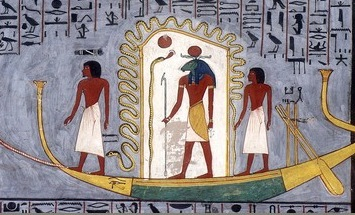
Ra in his ram-headed form traveling through the underworld in his solar barque on the subterrestrial Nile, from the copy of the Book of Gates in the tomb of Ramses I (KV16)

Ra was thought to travel on the Atet, two solar barques called the Mandjet (the Boat of Millions of Years) or morning-boat and the Mesektet or evening-boat. These boats took him on his journey through the sky and the Duat – twelve hours of night which is also the literal underworld of Egypt. While Ra was on the Mesektet, he was in his ram-headed form. When Ra traveled in his sun-boat, he was accompanied by various other deities including Sia (perception) and Hu (command), as well as Heka (magic power). Sometimes, members of the Ennead helped him on his journey, including Set, who overcame the serpent Apophis, and Mehen, who defended against the monsters of the underworld. When Ra was in the underworld, he would visit all of his various forms.

Apophis, the god of chaos (isfet), was an enormous serpent who attempted to stop the sun-boat's journey every night by consuming it or by stopping it in its tracks with a hypnotic stare. During the evening, the Egyptians believed that Ra set as Atum or in the form of a ram. The night boat would carry him through the underworld and back towards the east in preparation for his rebirth. These myths of Ra represented the sun rising as the rebirth of the sun by the sky-goddess Nut; thus attributing the concept of rebirth and renewal to Ra and strengthening his role as a creator god as well.

When Ra was in the underworld, he merged with Osiris, the god of the dead.

== Iconography ==
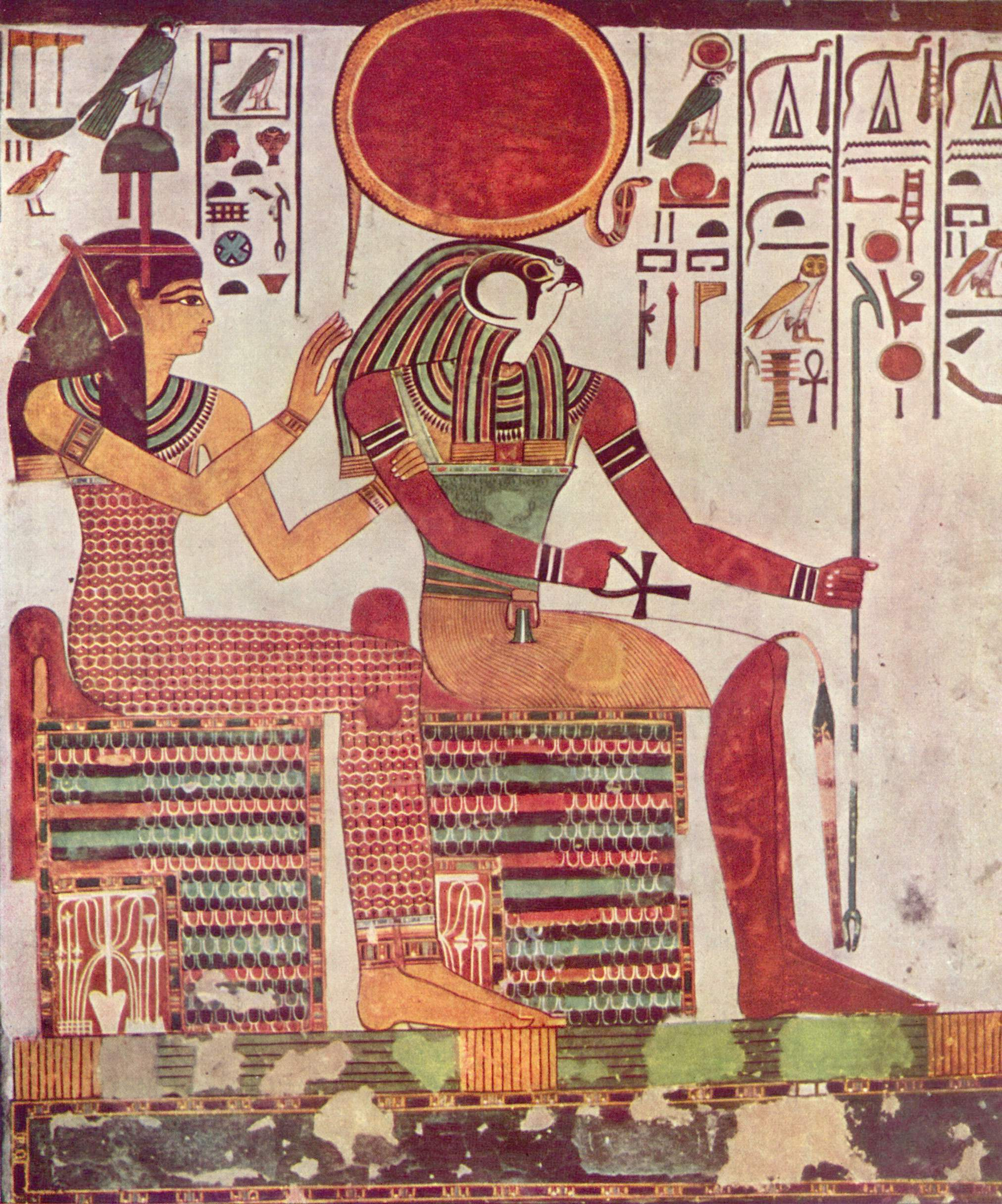
Ra and Imentet from the tomb of Nefertari, 13th century BC

Ra was portrayed as a man with the head of most likely either a lanner or peregrine falcon, adorned with a sun disk with a Cobra around it, and shared characteristics with the sky-god Horus.

Ra was represented in a variety of forms. Other common forms are a man with the head of a beetle (in his form as Khepri), or a man with the head of a ram. Ra was also pictured as a full-bodied ram, beetle, phoenix, heron, serpent, bull, cat, or lion, among others.

He was most commonly featured with a ram's head in the Underworld. In this form, Ra is described as being the "ram of the west" or "ram in charge of his harem.

In some literature, Ra is described as an aging king with golden flesh, silver bones, and hair of lapis lazuli.

== Worship ==
The chief cultic center of Ra was Iunu "the Place of Pillars", later known to the Ptolemaic Kingdom as Heliopolis (Koine Greek: Ἡλιούπολις, lit. "Sun City") and today located in the suburbs of Cairo. He was identified with the local sun god Atum. As Atum or Atum-Ra, he was reckoned the first being and the originator of the Ennead ("The Nine"), consisting of Shu and Tefnut, Geb and Nut, Osiris, Set, Isis and Nephthys.

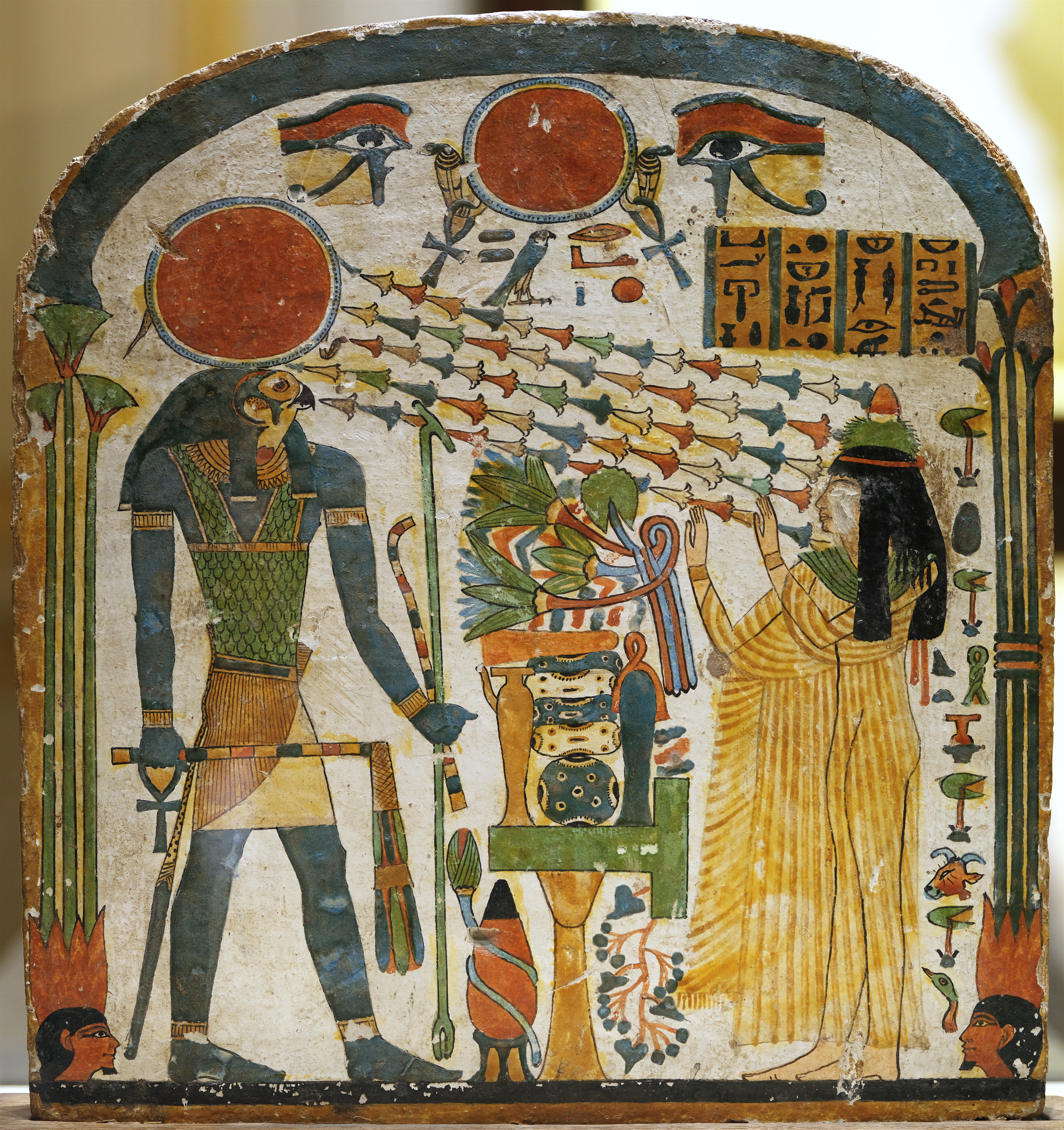
A woman worships Ra-Horakhty, who blesses her with rays of light.

Ra's local cult began to grow from roughly the Second Dynasty, establishing him as a sun-deity. By the Fourth Dynasty, pharaohs were seen as Ra's manifestations on Earth, referred to as "Sons of Ra". Ra was called the first king of Egypt, thus it was believed pharaohs were his descendants and successors. His worship increased massively in the Fifth Dynasty, when Ra became a state-deity and pharaohs had specially aligned pyramids, obelisks, and sun temples built in his honor. The rulers of the Fifth Dynasty told their followers that they were sons of Ra himself and the wife of the high priest of Heliopolis. These pharaohs spent much of Egypt's money on sun-temples. The first Pyramid Texts began to arise, giving Ra more and more significance in the journey of the pharaoh through the Duat (underworld).

During the Middle Kingdom, Ra was increasingly affiliated and combined with other chief deities, especially Amun and Osiris.

At the time of the New Kingdom of Egypt, the worship of Ra had become more complicated and grander. The walls of tombs were dedicated to extremely detailed texts that depicted Ra's journey through the underworld. Ra was said to carry the prayers and blessings of the living with the souls of the dead on the sun-boat. The idea that Ra aged with the sun became more popular during the rise of the New Kingdom.

Many acts of worship included hymns, prayers and spells to help Ra and the sun-boat overcome Apophis.

The rise of Christianity in the Roman Empire put an end to the worship of Ra.

== Relationship to other gods ==
=== Gods merged with Ra ===
As with most widely worshipped Egyptian deities, Ra's identity was often combined with other gods', forming an interconnection between deities.

Amun and Amun-Ra

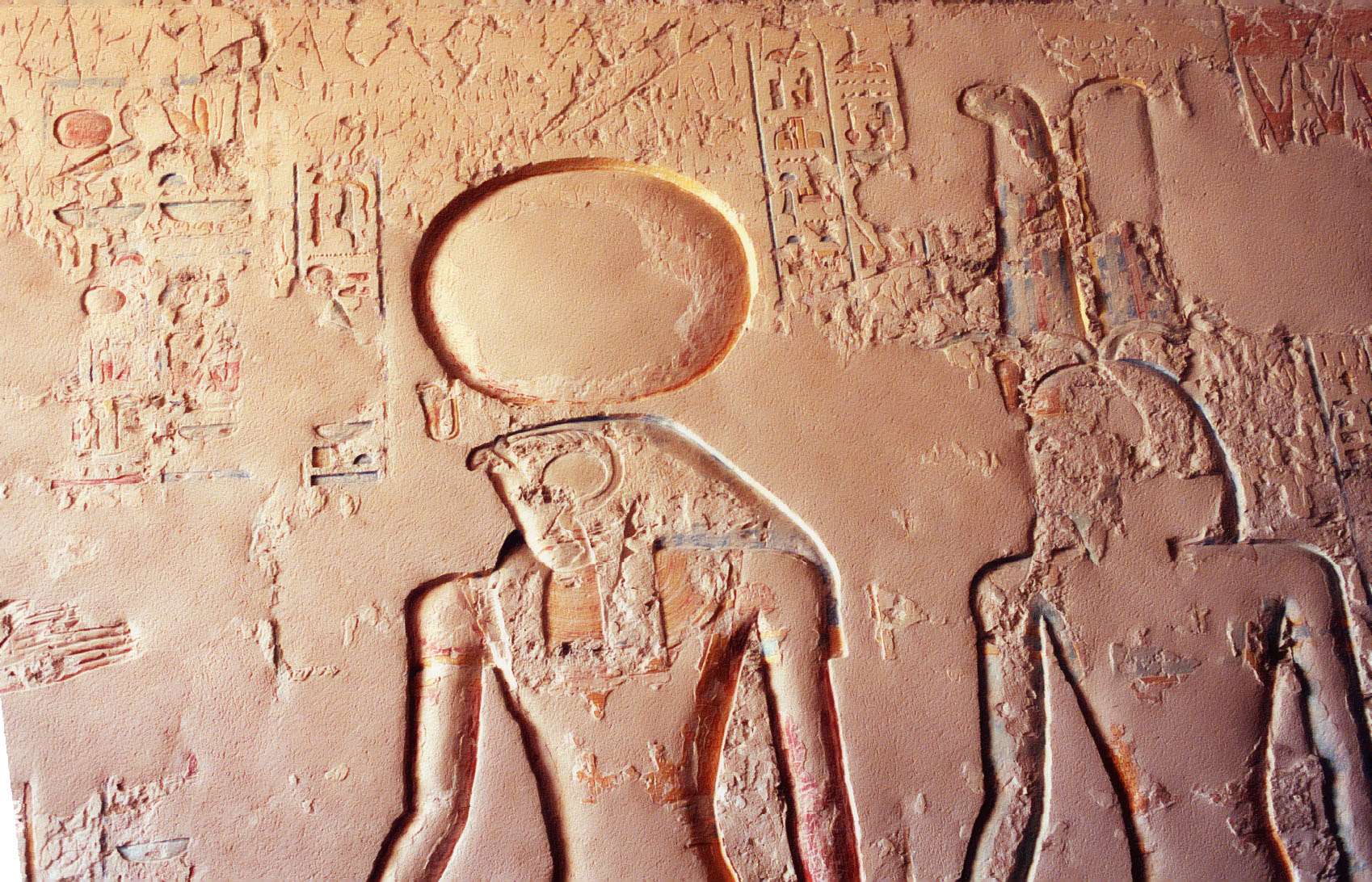
Ra and Amun, from the tomb of Ramses IV.

Amun was a member of the Ogdoad, representing creation-energies with Amaunet, a very early patron of Thebes. He was believed to create via breath and thus was identified with the wind rather than the Sun. As the cults of Amun and Ra became increasingly popular in Upper and Lower Egypt respectively, they were combined to create Amun-Ra, a solar creator god. It is hard to distinguish exactly when this combination happened, but references to Amun-Ra appeared in pyramid texts as early as the Fifth Dynasty. The most common belief is that Amun-Ra was invented as a new state-deity by the Theban rulers of the New Kingdom to unite worshippers of Amun with the older cult of Ra around the 18th Dynasty. Amun-Ra was given the official title "King of the Gods" by worshippers, and images show the combined deity as a red-eyed man with a lion's head that had a surrounding solar disk.
Atum and Atum-Ra
Atum-Ra (or Ra-Atum) was another composite deity formed from two completely separate deities; however, Ra shared more similarities with Atum than with Amun. Atum was more closely linked with the Sun, and was also a creator god of the Ennead. Both Ra and Atum were regarded as the father of the deities and pharaohs and were widely worshipped. In older myths, Atum was the creator of Tefnut and Shu, and he was born from the ocean Nun.

Ra-Horakhty

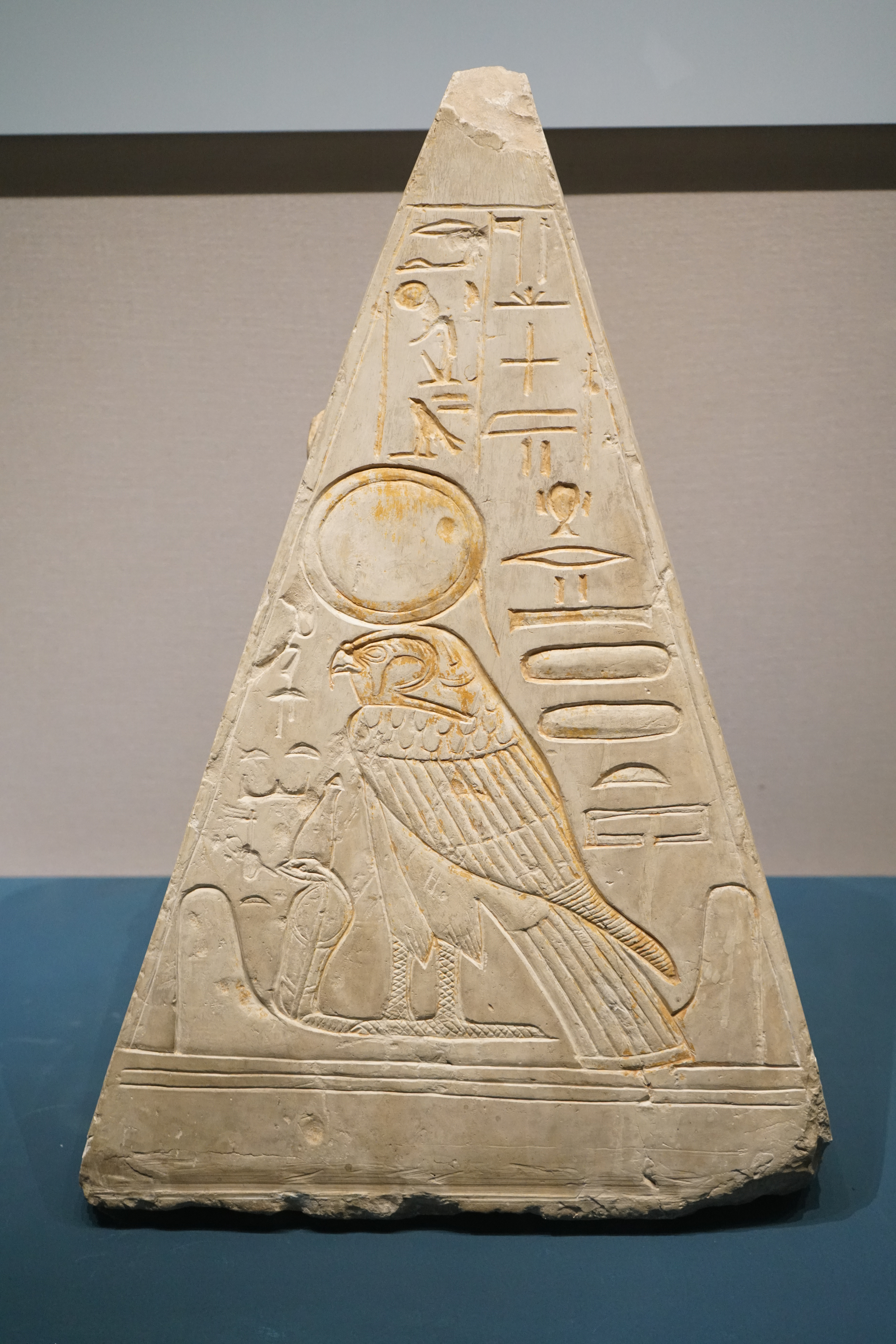
Pyramidion of Khonsu, with the image of Ra-Horakhty in the middle.

In later Egyptian mythology, Ra-Horakhty was more of a title or manifestation than a composite deity. It translates as "Ra (who is) Horus of the Horizons". It was intended to link Horakhty (as a sunrise-oriented aspect of Horus) to Ra. It has been suggested that Ra-Horakhty simply refers to the sun's journey from horizon to horizon as Ra, or that it means to show Ra as a symbolic deity of hope and rebirth. (See earlier section #Journey of the Sun).
He is proclaimed king of the gods in the tomb of Horemheb. Pharaoh Thutmose III dedicated the pillars of Heliopolis to Horakhty.
Ra-Horakhty is very present in the Book of the Dead of the 3rd Intermediate Period. He can be seen sitting on his throne in the Book of the Dead of Nedjmet, Padikhons, Nestanebetisheru, Djedkhonsiusankh, Tameniu and in the Amduat Papyrus Inscribed for Nesitaset.
Khepri and Khnum
Khepri was a scarab beetle who rolled up the Sun in the mornings and was sometimes seen as the morning manifestation of Ra. Similarly, the ram-headed god Khnum was also seen as the evening manifestation of Ra. The idea of different deities (or different aspects of Ra) ruling over different times of the day was fairly common but variable. With Khepri and Khnum taking precedence over sunrise and sunset, Ra often was the representation of midday when the sun reached its peak at noon. Sometimes different aspects of Horus were used instead of Ra's aspects.

Montu and Montu-Ra

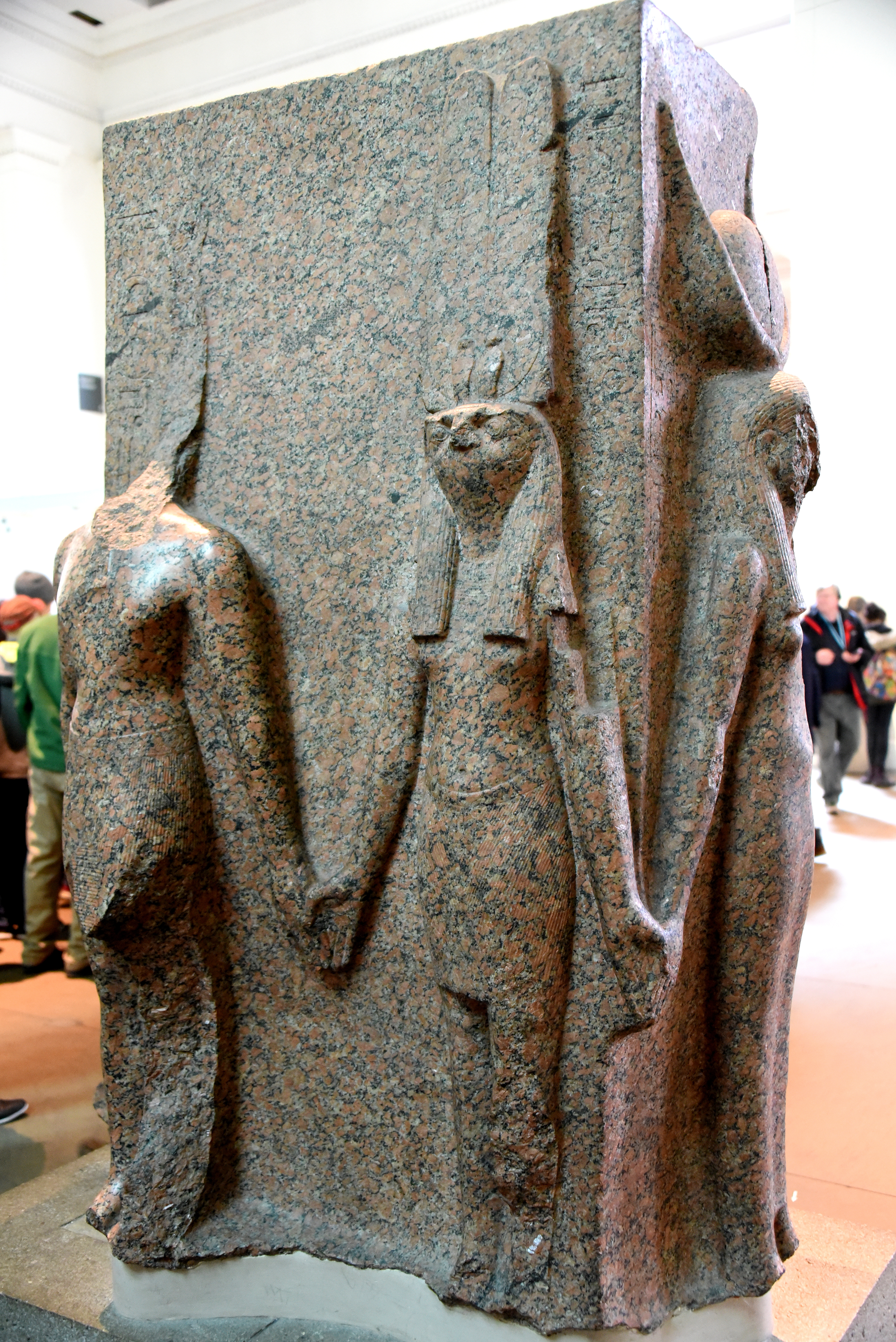
Sculpture of Thutmose III (now headless), who stands hand in hand with the god Montu-Ra (falcon-headed) and the goddess Hathor.

A very ancient god, Montu was originally a manifestation of the scorching effect of Ra, the sun – and as such often appeared under the epithet Montu-Ra. It is possible that Montu-Ra and Atum-Ra symbolized the two kingships, respectively, of Upper and Lower Egypt. Montu had several consorts, including a female aspect of Ra, Raet-Tawy. In Egyptian art, Montu was depicted with his head surmounted by the solar disk, because of his conceptual link with Ra.

Raet-Tawy
Raet or Raet-Tawy was a female aspect of Ra; she did not have much importance independent of him. In some myths she was considered to be either Ra's wife or his daughter, as well as Montu's wife.

==== Images ====
Ra-Khepri was sometimes depicted as a scarab pushing a sun disk.

Ra-Horakhty depicted as a falcon wearing a sun disk

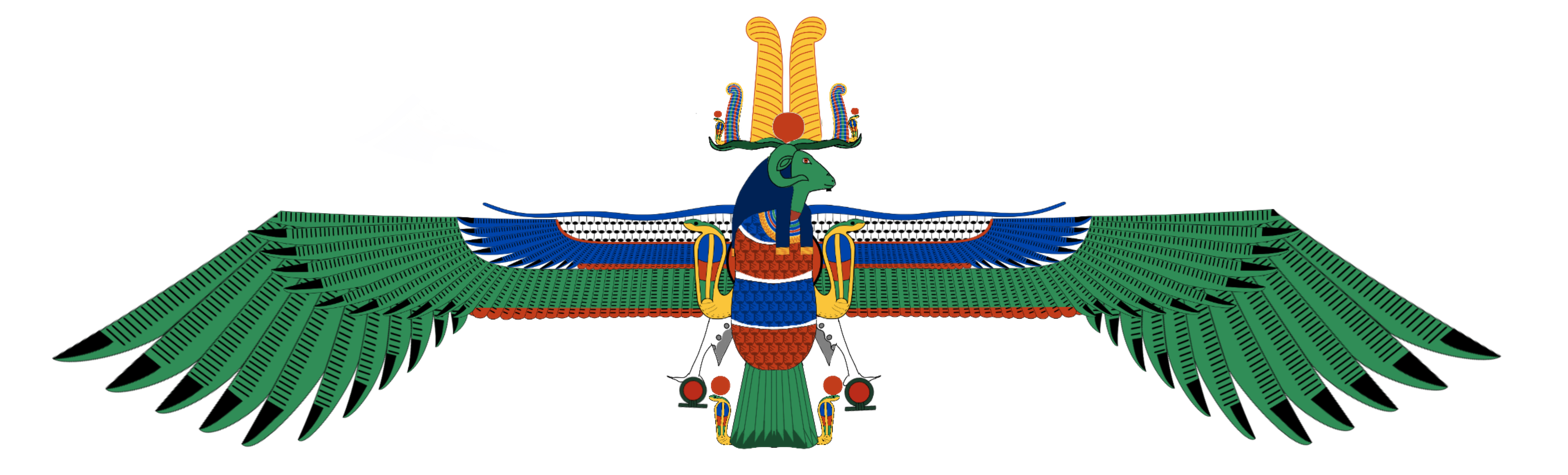
The ba of Ra depicted as a ram-headed falcon based on a depiction in KV14, the joint tomb of Tausert and Setnakhte

Ra-Horakhty was depicted like Horus, but wearing a sun disk instead of a Pschent, in modern and ancient times, Ra proper is often just represented like this.

While in the underworld, Ra (Khnum-Ra) was depicted with the head of a ram and a sun disk.

Amun-Ra was depicted similar to Amun but had a sun disk on his headdress.

Amun-Ra (himself a combination of Amun and Ra) was occasionally equated with Min to form a God called Amun-Ra-Kamutef, who was depicted similar to Min but had a sun disk on his headdress.

=== Gods created by Ra ===
In some myths, Ra was thought to have created almost every other Egyptian god.

Bastet
Bastet (also called Bast) is sometimes known as the "cat of Ra". She is also his daughter by Isis and is associated with Ra's instrument of vengeance, the sun-god's eye. Bastet is known for decapitating the serpent Apophis (Ra's sworn enemy and the "God" of Chaos) to protect Ra. In one myth, Ra sent Bastet as a lioness to Nubia.

Sekhmet
Sekhmet is another daughter of Ra. Sekhmet was depicted as a lioness or large cat, and was an "eye of Ra", or an instrument of the sun god's vengeance. In one myth, Sekhmet was so filled with rage that Ra was forced to turn her into a cow so that she would not cause unnecessary harm. In another myth, Ra fears that humankind is plotting against him and sends Hathor (another daughter of Ra) to punish humanity. While slaughtering humans she takes the form of Sekhmet. To prevent her from killing all humanity, Ra orders that beer be dyed red and poured out on the land. Mistaking the beer for blood, Sekhmet drinks it, and upon becoming intoxicated, she reverts to her pacified form, Hathor.

Hathor
Hathor is another daughter of Ra. When Ra feared that humankind was plotting against him, he sent Hathor as an "eye of Ra". In one myth, Hathor danced naked in front of Ra until he laughed to cure him of a fit of sulking. When Ra was without Hathor, he fell into a state of deep depression. In the New kingdom, Ra came to be associated with the epithet "Kamutef" ('Bull of his mother') alongside Amun. As Kamutef, he was seen as the son and husband of Hathor who impregnates his own mother to give birth to himself.

=== Other gods ===
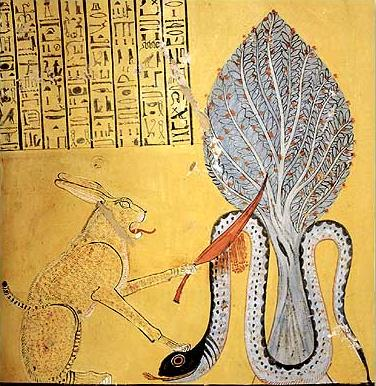
Ra in the form of Great Cat, slays Apophis

Ptah
Ptah is rarely mentioned in the literature of Old Kingdom pyramids. This is believed by some to be a result of the Ra-worshipping people of Heliopolis being the main writers of these inscriptions.

Isis
In one myth, Isis created a serpent to poison Ra and only gave him the antidote when he revealed his true name to her. Isis passed this name on to Horus, bolstering his royal authority.
Apep
Apep, also called Apophis, was the god of chaos and Ra's arch-enemy. He was said to lie just below the horizon line, trying to devour Ra as Ra traveled through the underworld.

Aten
Aten was the focus of Atenism, the religious system established in ancient Egypt by the Eighteenth Dynasty pharaoh Akhenaten. The Aten was the disc of the sun and was originally an aspect of Ra.

== See also ==
- List of solar deities
- Solar myths
