= Bucheum =

Ancient Egyptian cemetery for Buchis bulls

- House of Atum
- Location within Egypt
- 25.682°N 32.516°E
- Type: Animal catacomb
- Periods: Thirtieth Dynasty - Roman Egypt
- Location: Hermonthis, Egypt

History
- Built: c. 350 BC
- Built by: Nectanebo II - Diocletian
- Abandoned: c. 300 AD

Site notes
- Excavation dates: 1928–1932
- Archaeologists: Mond, Frankfort, Groenewegen-Frankfort, Emery, J. P. Pendlebury, H. W. Pendlebury, Glanville, Shorter, Mr. and Mrs. Green, Myers, Fairman, Scott, Walle, Baly, Shaw, Buchanan, Lester
- Public access: No

The Bucheum was the ancient Egyptian burial place for sacred bulls of the Buchis cult at Hermonthis. It consists of underground tunnels which connect the burial chambers of the bulls.

It was founded by Nectanebo II, around 350 BC, who based it on the practices at the Serapeum of Saqqara at Memphis. The Bucheum was in use for approximately 650 years, until at least the reign of emperor Diocletian (c. 300 AD), far outlasting its Memphite counterpart.

Many of the burial chambers were equipped with sarcophagi, which were either monolithic boxes with a trapezoidal lid, like those at the Serapeum, or polylithic. Multiple Buchis mummies survived in situ, albeit heavily damaged from flooding, looting and collapsed ceilings. They were fastened to boards with metal clamps, had artificial eyes, and were partially covered in gold leaf.

The mother-cows of the Buchis were buried at the nearby Baqaria, which is analogous to the Iseum of Saqqara where the mothers of the Apis bulls were put to rest.

== See also ==
- Apis (deity) – Ancient Egyptian deity
- Mnevis – Ancient Egyptian deity

== Bibliography ==
- Dodson, Aidan (2005). "Bull Cults". Divine Creatures: Animal Mummies in Ancient Egypt. pp. 72–102. doi:10.5743/cairo/9789774248580.003.0004. ISBN 9789774248580.
- Mond, Robert (1934a). The Bucheum. Vol. 1: The history and archaeology of the site.
- Mond, Robert (1934b). The Bucheum. Vol. 2: The inscriptions.
- Mond, Robert (1934c). The Bucheum. Vol. 3: The plates.
