= Hesat =

Ancient Egyptian cow goddess

- Hesat as a recumbent cow
Name in hieroglyphs
HA V17 t or V28 O34 G39 G1 t E4
- Offspring: Anubis

Hesat is an ancient Egyptian goddess in the form of a cow. She was said to provide humanity with milk (called "the beer of Hesat") and in particular to suckle the pharaoh and several ancient Egyptian bull gods. In the Pyramid Texts she is said to be the mother of Anubis and of the deceased king. She was especially connected with Mnevis, the living bull god worshipped at Heliopolis; the mothers of Mnevis bulls were buried in a cemetery dedicated to Hesat. In Ptolemaic times (304–30 BC) she was closely linked with the goddess Isis.

In Egyptian mythology, Hathor is one of the main cattle deities, as she is the mother of Horus and Ra, and therefore closely associated with the role of royalty and kingship. Hesat is one of Hathor's manifestations, usually portrayed as a white cow representing purity and the milk that she produces to give life to humanity. Other feminine bovine deities include Sekhat-Hor, Mehet-Weryt, and Shedyt. Their masculine counterparts include Apis, Mnevis, Sema-wer, Ageb-wer.

== Artistic representations ==
While there are not many images of Hesat that are recorded and published, there are a few representations on pieces that belong to major museums worldwide. The Metropolitan Museum of Art has in its collection Scarab with the Representation of Hathor as a Cow. The hieroglyphs on this late period piece read ḥȜst or ḥsȜt determined with a recumbent cow with the following hieroglyphs:

HA V17 t

This spelling of her name is using cryptographic substitution, which became established in the New Kingdom. Traditionally phonetic spellings of Hesat's name from earlier periods were usually written as follows:

V28 O34 G39 G1 t E4
