= Kemwer =

Kemwer means "great black (one)" in the Egyptian language, and may refer to:

- An epithet of Horus, who was viewed as a nature spirit with the qualities of a hawk
- A description of the Mnevis bull
