= Penelope Eames =

British furniture historian and archivist

- Born: Penelope Fox
- Spouse: John V. H. Eames
- Awards: The CINOA Award (1977)

Academic background
- Education: MA, PhD
- Alma mater: University of Liverpool
- Thesis: Furniture in England, France and the Netherlands from the twelfth to the fifteenth century

Academic work
- Discipline: Historian
- Sub-discipline: Egyptology, Furniture History

Penelope Eames (née Fox) is a furniture historian and was the Assistant Secretary at the Griffith Institute, University of Oxford, during the compilation of the Tutankhamun photograph archive.

== Biography ==
Fox was the Assistant Secretary at the Griffith Institute, University of Oxford, during the late 1940s to 1952. During this time, she collaborated with Nora E. Scott, then at the Metropolitan Museum of Art, to compare and try to make equivalent the two archives of photographs taken by Harry Burton of the objects from the Tomb of Tutankhamun. This process took nearly three years.

During her time at the Griffith Institute, she wrote Tutankhamun's Treasures (1951) and a 65-page report of the Metropolitan Museum of Art and Griffith Institute's two collections of the images, both of which are published under the name Penelope Fox. The latter report was still being used in the 1990s for consulting the archive.

In April 1952, Fox married John V. H. Eames and together they had a son. At the time of her marriage, she left the Griffith Institute, and her publications after her marriage are under the name Penelope Eames.

Following her marriage, Eames read history at University of Liverpool and studied furniture of the medieval period. She was awarded her MA in 1969, with a thesis entitled "The character and use of domestic furnishings in England as discernible from documentry and archaelogical evidence from the 11th-15th centuries." She completed her doctorate in 1975 at the University of Liverpool. Her tutors included Henry Mayr-Harting, Alexander Reginald Myers, Christopher N. L. Brooke, and Christopher T. Allmand.

She held Leverhulme Trust and University of Liverpool Research Fellowships following the completion of her PhD. For the publication of her doctoral thesis as a book, "Furniture in England, France and the Netherlands from the twelfth to the fifteenth century," she received the 1977 award of Confédération Internationale des Négociants en Œuvres d'Art (CINOA). She also received funding from The Paul Mellon Centre for Studies in British Art (London) and the University of Liverpool for the publication of her book.

== Publications ==
Fox published in both Egyptology and Furniture History, including:

- Fox, Penelope (1951). Tutankhamun's treasure. Oxford: Oxford University Press.
- Eames, Penelope (1971). "Documentary Evidence Concerning the Character and Use of Domestic Furnishings in England in the Fourteenth and Fifteenth Centuries". Furniture History. 7: 41–60. ISSN 0016-3058.
- Eames, Penelope (1977). Furniture in England, France and the Netherlands from the twelfth to the fifteenth century. London: The Furniture History Society. ISBN 978-0-903335-02-7.
- Eames, Penelope (1997). "The Making of a Hung Celour". Furniture History. 33: 35–42. ISSN 0016-3058.
