= Buchis =

Ancient Egyptian deity

Name in hieroglyphs
b X E1
- Major cult center: Hermonthis
- Symbol: white bull with a black snout

In Egyptian mythology, Buchis (Ancient Greek: Βουχις, Coptic: ⲃⲱⲱϩ, ⲃⲟϩ) (also spelt Bakh and Bakha) was the deification of the kꜣ ("power, life-force", Egyptological pronunciation ka) of the war god Montu as a sacred bull that was worshipped in the region of Hermonthis. In order to be chosen as the Buchis incarnation of Montu, a bull was required to have a white body and black face. When these bulls – and in later times also their mothers – died, they were mummified, and placed in a special cemetery known as the Bucheum.

Unlike the other Egyptian sacred bulls – the Apis and the Mnevis – the Buchis cult started towards the end of the pharaonic period, with the earliest known burial taking place in regnal year 14 of Nectanebo II (mid 4th century BC). However, four different bull cults dedicated to Montu were known in earlier times in Upper Egypt, and it seems that the Buchis was the result of their syncretism. Eventually, the Buchis bull was identified as a form of the Apis, and consequently became considered an incarnation of Osiris.

It is uncertain when the Buchis cult disappeared. The last confirmed tomb at the Bucheum is dated to the regnal year 12 of Diocletian (circa 295 CE), while the latest attestation of a Buchis burial is a stela reporting its installation in regnal year 33 of Diocletian (317 AD) and its demise in regnal year 57 of the same pharaoh (more precisely on 4 November 340 AD). (Note: Diocletian's rule ended in 305 AD (after circa 20 years of reign) and he died in 312 AD, yet the author of the stela kept counting the years from the beginning of Diocletian's reign as if he were still alive and ruling, while the installation and the death of this Buchis actually occurred under the rule of Licinius and Constans respectively.)
