= Nora E. Scott =

American Egyptologist (1905–1994)

Nora Elizabeth Scott (July 14, 1905 – April 4, 1994) was an Egyptologist and Curator of Egyptian Art at the Metropolitan Museum of Art. She was also the author of two museum monographs and numerous articles on ancient Egypt.

== Biography ==
Nora Elizabeth Scott was born in Prestwick, Scotland in 1905. The family moved to Kingston, Ontario, Canada, a few years later when her father, Ernest F. Scott, took up a post as professor at Queen's College. In 1919, the family moved to New York, where Ernest Scott became a professor at Union Theological Seminary. Scott got her undergraduate degree in classics from Barnard College. She continued her education at Oxford University in 1927, studying Egyptology with Francis Llewellyn Griffith and Aylward M. Blackman, leaving with a second B.A. followed by an M.A.

Scott began archaeological field work with the Egypt Exploration Society at Armant (1929–30), following which she took a job with the Metropolitan Museum of Art's Department of Egyptian Art. Initially her activities at the Met were focused on archival work with expedition photographs, especially those of the Tomb of Tutankhamun, working with Penelope Fox on making equivalent the Met and Griffith Institute's archives of Harry Burton's photographs. She later expanded into organizing exhibitions and contributed over a dozen articles to the Bulletin of the Metropolitan Museum of Art. She also took part in a 1933 Danish expedition at Hama in Syria. By 1968, she had risen to be the curator and head of department of Egyptian art at the Met and was the editor of several museum monographs. Her main areas of curatorial interest were daily life and decorative arts. She worked at the Met for over 40 years, retiring in 1972.

Scott also taught as an adjunct professor at Columbia University. She served at different times as secretary and president of the New York Society of the Archaeological Institute of America.

After retiring, she moved to Pennsylvania, where she died in 1994.

== Publications ==
- The Home Life of the Ancient Egyptians (1945)
- Egyptian Statuettes (1953)
