= Bull Site =

Open air ancient cult installation now in the West Bank

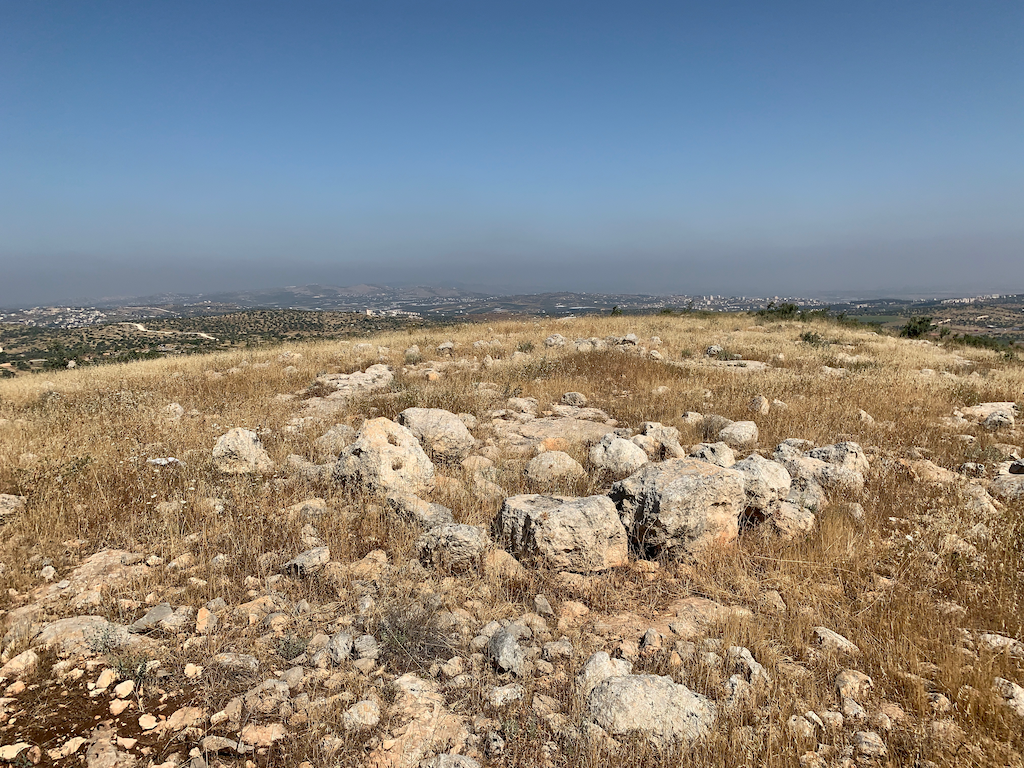
- The Bull Site on the Dhahrat et-Tawileh ridge

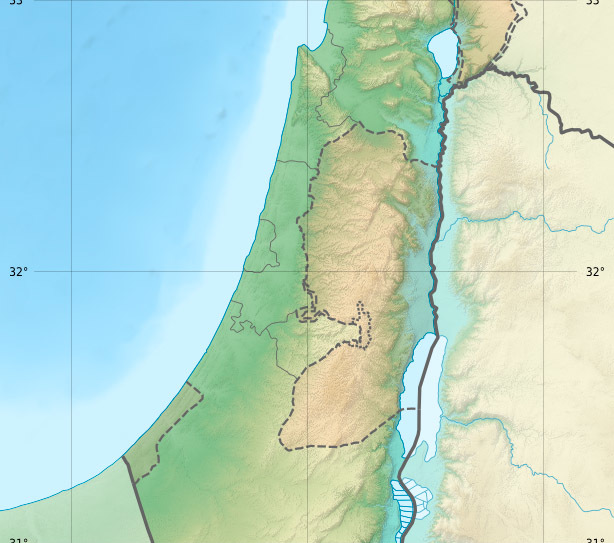
- Location within West Bank
- 32.409152°N 35.323578°E
- Type: Cult installation
- Periods: Iron IA
- Cultures: Canaanite, Israelite, or migratory population
- Location: Dhahrat et-Tawileh
- Region: West Bank

History
- Built: 12th century BCE
- Abandoned: 12th century BCE

Site notes
- Material: Stone, bedrock
- Elevation: 455 m (1,493 ft)
- Length: 23 m (75 ft)
- Width: 21 m (69 ft)
- Area: 380 m^{2} (4,100 sq ft)
- Excavation dates: Apr 1978, Sept 1981
- Archaeologists: Amihai Mazar
- Discovered: 1977
- Condition: In ruins

The so-called Bull Site is a 12th-century BCE open air ancient cult installation found at Dhahrat et-Tawileh (also spelled Daharat et-Tawileh), in the West Bank. The site is named for the bronze sacred bull statuette which was found at the site in 1977.

== Location ==
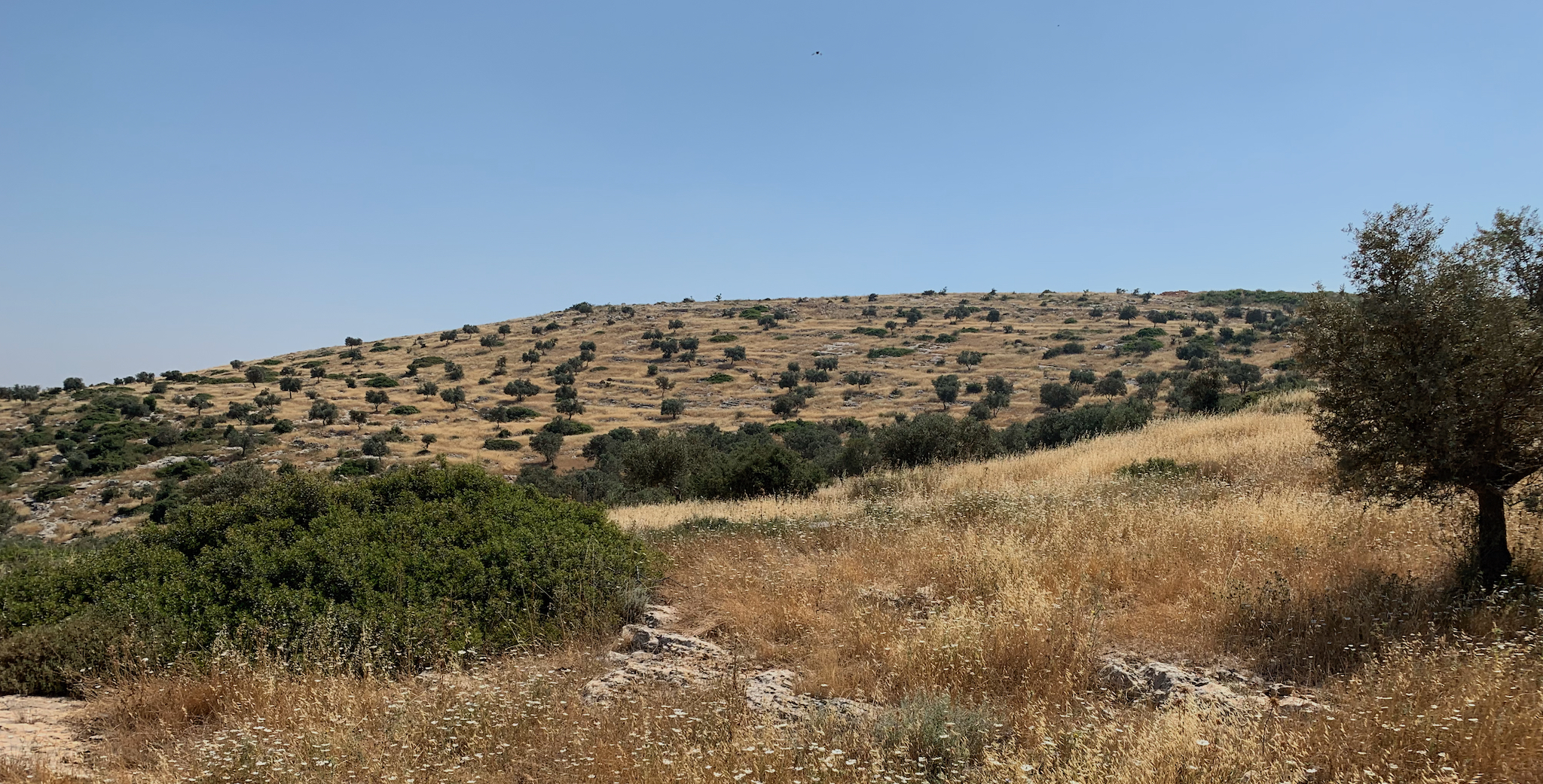
Dhahrat et-Tawileh ridge

The site is located on the Dhahrat et-Tawileh ridge in the hills of the northern West Bank in Jenin Governorate, 75 meters above the ancient road through the Zababdeh valley between Dothan and Tirzah. It lies approximately 6 km south of Jenin, and 4 km east of Qabatiya. The site provides commanding views of other high points in northern Canaan including Mount Carmel to the west, Mount Tabor and Mount Meron to the north, Mount Gilboa to the northeast, and to the south Jebel Tamun (also spelled Jabal Tammun, 'Mount Tammun', some 2 km SSE of the town of Tammun, altitude 588 m, prominence 291 m).

== Discovery ==
The site was discovered in 1977 by Ofer Broshi, a member of Kibbutz Shamir and soldier in the Israeli army, where he unearthed an ancient bull statuette. He brought the figurine back to his kibbutz where it was put on display with other antiquities owned by the kibbutz. While on display it was spotted by archaeologist Amihai Mazar who arranged its transfer to the Israel Museum where it is now part of the permanent collection. Based on Broshi's description Mazar was able to locate the discovery site at Dhahrat et-Tawileh and begin excavations.

== Excavation history ==
Two short excavations were conducted by Mazar in April 1978 and September 1981 on behalf of the Institute of Archaeology at the Hebrew University of Jerusalem. Results of the excavation show that the site was single-phase (Iron IA) and was abandoned after only a short period of use. The archaeological evidence indicates the site's use as a cultic installation though the flint and pottery assemblage discovered potentially indicates domestic use. Israel Finkelstein's dating of the site to the Middle Bronze Age is, according to Mazar, based on a misreading of the pottery evidence and as such an early 12th-century dating should be retained.

== Cult installation ==
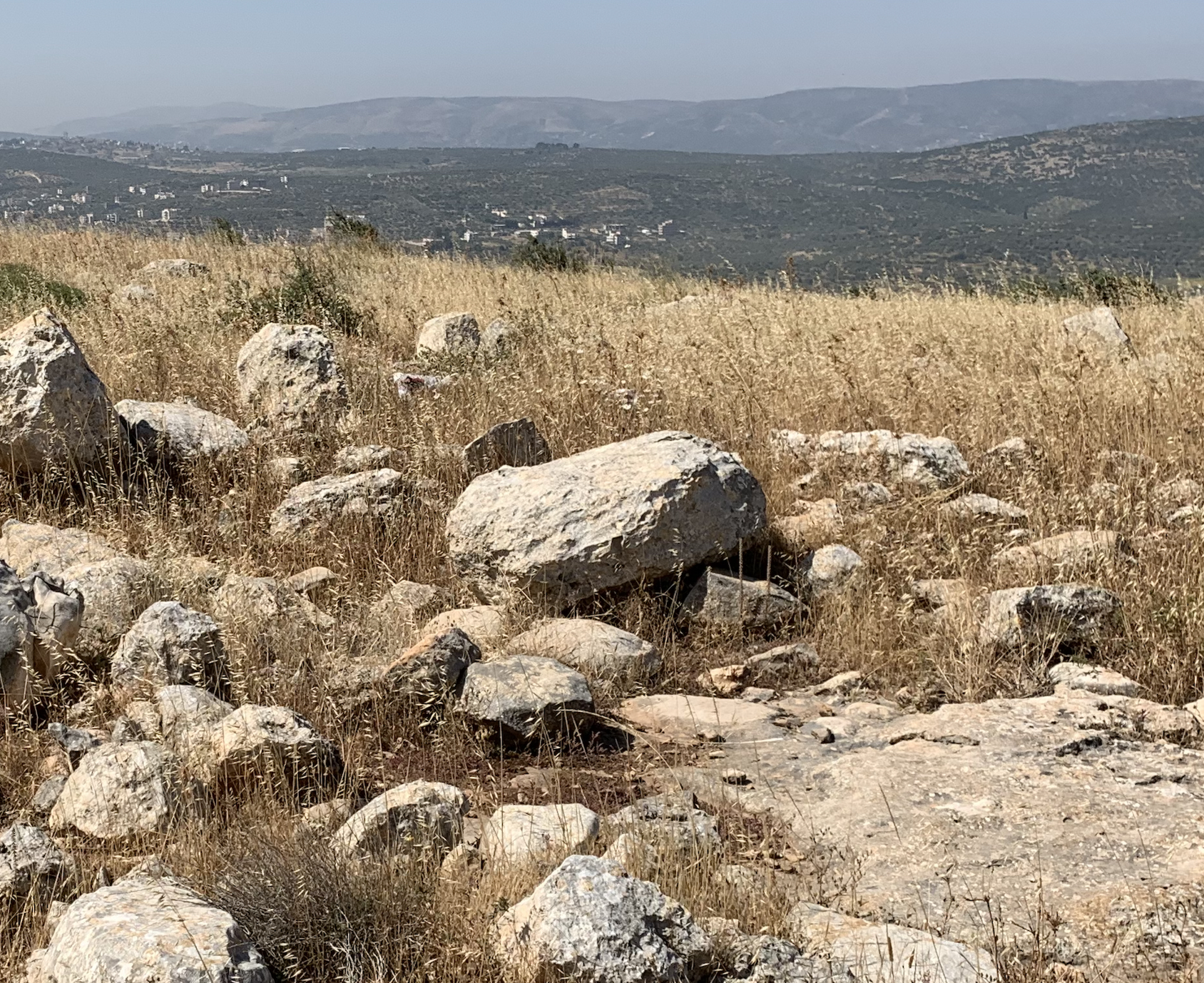
The standing stone or altar at the Bull Site (center)

Though there are a number of Iron Age I settlements in the area, the Bull Site lacks any evidence of settlement. Instead it sits on the summit of Dhahrat et-Tawileh and is thought to have served as a cult site for the surrounding settlements due to its hilltop location.

Built on bedrock in the 12th century, the site comprises a perimeter wall made from large boulders brought in from elsewhere, and what is thought to be a standing stone or altar with a paved area in front of it next to the enclosure's eastern entrance. Mazar, the excavation director, speculates that a sacred tree likely grew within the site's walls.

There is no agreement on the ethnicity of the local settlers who used the site, with suggestions ranging from the Israelites due to the site's location in Mannaseh's tribal allotment (Joshua 17:1–13), the Canaanites, or migrants from north of Canaan.

Alternative views are that the site could have been a home for a family and their animals, or an enclosure for livestock.

== Calf statuette ==
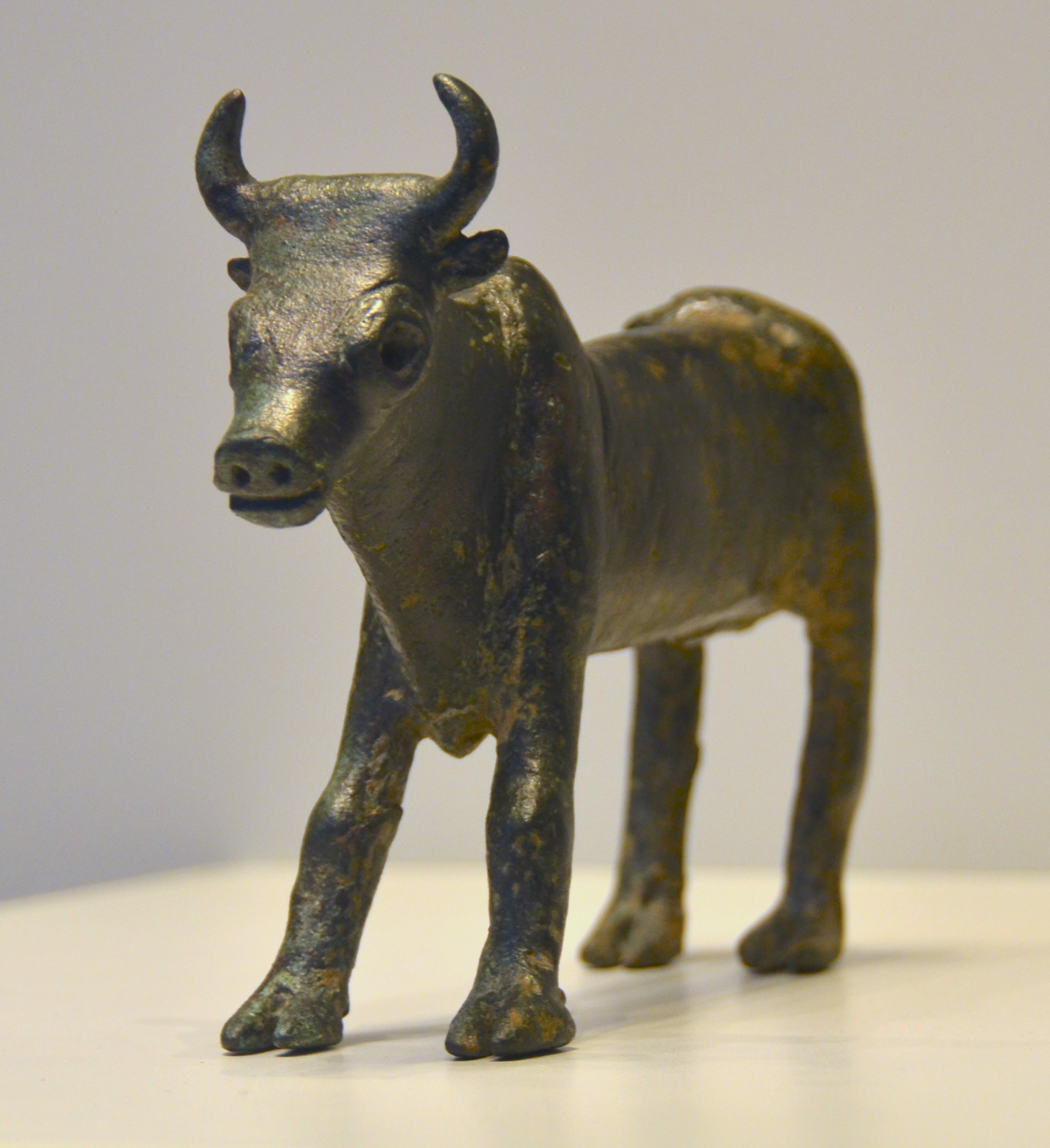
The bronze calf statuette discovered at the 12th-century BCE cult site at Dhahrat et-Tawileh, West Bank, currently in the Israel Museum

The statuette, found close to the western wall of the site, is of a Zebu bull measuring 17.5 cm long by 12.4 cm high and is made of bronze. It is notable not only for its naturalistic ears and eyes, but for being the largest such bull statuette found in Palestine. Though Mazar suggests it may be the product of a local Israelite craftsman, other scholars such as Ahlström believe it came either from Galilee, or further north again above the land of Canaan.

There is no consensus about which deity the statuette represents; it could be an image of Baal or Yahweh.

== See also ==
- Ancient Canaanite religion
- Sacred bull
- Origins of Judaism
- History of ancient Israel and Judah

== Bibliography ==
- Ahlström, Gösta W. (November 1990). "The Bull Figurine from Dhahrat et-Tawileh". Bulletin of the American Schools of Oriental Research. 280 (280): 77–82. doi:10.2307/1357311. JSTOR 1357311. S2CID 163751741.
- Alpert Nakhai, Beth (2001). Archaeology and the Religions of Canaan and Israel. Boston, MA: American Schools of Oriental Research. ISBN 978-0897570572.
- Bloch-Smith, Elizabeth; Alpert Nakhai, Beth (1999). "A Landscape Comes to Life". Near Eastern Archaeology. 62 (2). doi:10.2307/3210703. JSTOR 3210703. S2CID 163482783.
- Coogan, Michael David (1987). "Of Cults and Cultures: Reflections on the Interpretation of Archaeological Evidence". Palestine Exploration Quarterly. 119 (1): 1–8. doi:10.1179/peq.1987.119.1.1.
- Dorsey, David A. (1991). The Roads and Highways of Ancient Israel. The ASOR Library of Biblical and Near Eastern Archaeology. Wipf and Stock. ISBN 978-1-5326-6089-4.
- Faust, Avraham (2006). Israel's Ethnogenesis: Settlement, Interaction, Expansion and Resistance. London and New York: Routledge. ISBN 9781845534561.
- Finkelstein, Israel (1998). "Two notes on Northern Samaria: the 'Einun Pottery' and the date of the 'Bull Site'". Palestine Exploration Quarterly. 130 (2): 94–98. doi:10.1179/peq.1998.130.2.94.
- Mazar, Amihai (Summer 1982). "The "Bull Site": An Iron Age I Open Cult Place". Bulletin of the American Schools of Oriental Research (247): 27–42. doi:10.2307/1356477. JSTOR 1356477. S2CID 164091738.
- Mazar, Amihai (September–October 1983). "Bronze Bull Found in Israelite "High Place" from the Time of the Judges". Biblical Archaeology Review. 9 (5).
- Mazar, Amihai (1993). "'Bull' Site". In Stern, Ephraim (ed.). The New Encyclopedia of Archaeological Excavations in the Holy Land. Vol. 1. Carta. ISBN 0-13-276296-X.
- Mazar (1999). "The 'Bull Site' and the 'Einun Pottery' Reconsidered". Palestine Exploration Quarterly. 131 (2): 144–148. doi:10.1179/peq.1999.131.2.144.
- Miller, Patrick D. (2000). Israelite Religion and Biblical Theology: Collected Essays. Journal for the study of the Old Testament Supplement Series. Vol. 267. Sheffield Academic Press. ISBN 9781841271422.
- Miller II, Robert (2003). "Gazetteer of Iron I Sites in the North-Central Highlands". In Lapp, Nancy (ed.). Preliminary Excavation Reports and other Archaeological Excavations, Tell Qarqur; Iron I Sites in the North-Central Highlands of Palestine. The Annual of The American Schools of Oriental Research. Vol. 56. Boston, MA: American Schools of Oriental Research. ISBN 0-89757-026-X.
- Miller II, Robert D. (2005). Chieftains of the Highland Clans: A History of Israel in the Twelfth and Eleventh Centuries B.C. Grand Rapids, MI; Cambridge, U.K.: William B. Eerdmans Publishing Company. ISBN 978-0802809889.
- Mullins, Robert (2012). "The Bull Site". Encyclopedia of the Bible and Its Reception. Vol. 4. De Gruyter. ISBN 978-3110183559.
- Na'aman, Nadav (1994). "The 'Conquest of Canaan' in the Book of Joshua and in History". In Finkestein, Israel; Na'aman, Nadav (eds.). From Nomadism to Monarchy. Israel Exploration Society. ISBN 965-217-117-4.
- Alpert Nakhai, Beth (1994). "What's a Bamah? How Sacred Space Functioned in Ancient Israel". Biblical Archaeology Review. 20 (3).
- Parker, Simon B. (1997). Ugaritic Narrative Poetry. SBL Writings from the Ancient World. Vol. 9. Atlanta, GA: Scholars Press. ISBN 978-0788503375.
- Smith, Mark S. (2002). The Early History of God: Yahweh and the Other Deities in Ancient Israel. Grand Rapids, MI; Cambridge, U.K.; Dearborn, MI: William B. Eerdmans Publishing Company. ISBN 9781845534561.
- Zertal, Adam (2008). The Manasseh Hill Country Survey, Volume II, The Eastern Valleys and the Fringes of the Desert. Leiden; Boston: Brill. ISBN 978-9004163690.
- Zevit, Ziony (2003). "False Dichotomies in Descriptions of Israelite Religion: A Problem, Its Origin, and a Proposed Solution". In Dever, William; Gitin, Seymour (eds.). Symbiosis, Symbolism, and the Power of the Past: Canaan, Ancient Israel, and Their Neighbors from the Late Bronze Age through Roman Palaestina. Eisenbrauns Book Publishers. ISBN 978-1575060811.
