= Armant, Egypt =

Armant ⲉⲣⲙⲟⲛⲧ ⲣ̄ⲙⲟⲛⲧ أرْمَنْت
- Town
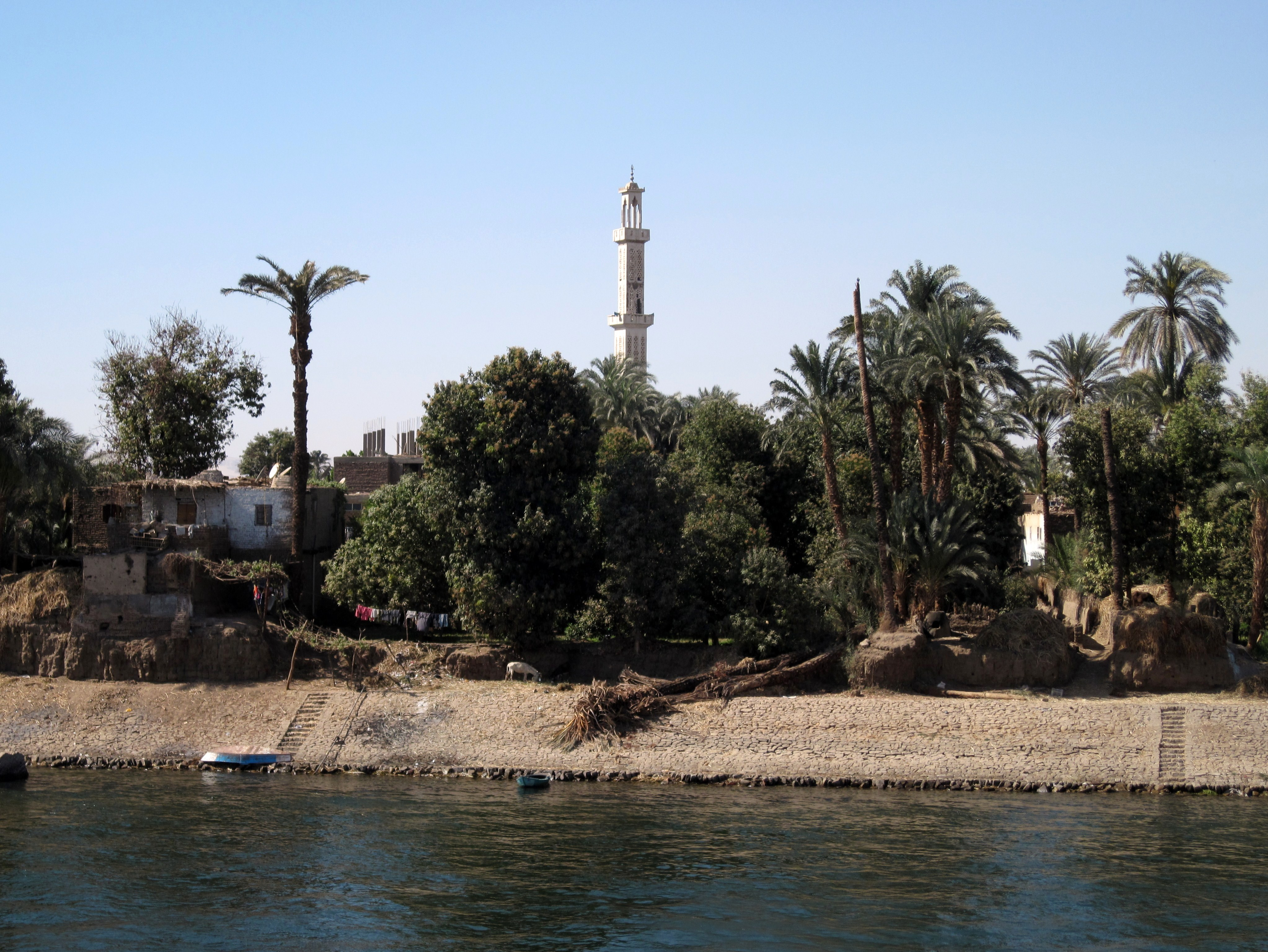
- Banks of the Nile at Armant

- Location in Egypt
- Coordinates: 25°37′N 32°32′E
- Country: Egypt
- Governorate: Luxor Governorate
- Time zone: UTC+2 (EET)
  - Summer (DST): UTC+3 (EEST)

Armant (Arabic: أرْمَنْت; Ancient Egyptian: jwn.w-n-mnṯ.w or jwn.w-šmꜥ.w; Bohairic: ⲉⲣⲙⲟⲛⲧ; Sahidic: ⲣ̄ⲙⲟⲛⲧ), also known as Hermonthis (Ancient Greek: Ἕρμωνθις), is a town located about 19 km (12 miles) south of Thebes. It was an important Middle Kingdom town, which was enlarged during the Eighteenth Dynasty. It is located today in the Luxor Governorate on the west bank of the Nile.

The ruined Temple of Hermonthis (sometimes Temple of Monthu) sits in the middle of the modern town.

iwn nw niwt mn n T t niwt
jwnw mnṯ(t)
in hieroglyphs
Era: Late Period
(664–332 BC)

iwn nw niwt M27 t niwt or iwn S1 t niwt
jwnw šmꜥ(t)
in hieroglyphs
Era: Late Period
(664–332 BC)

== History ==
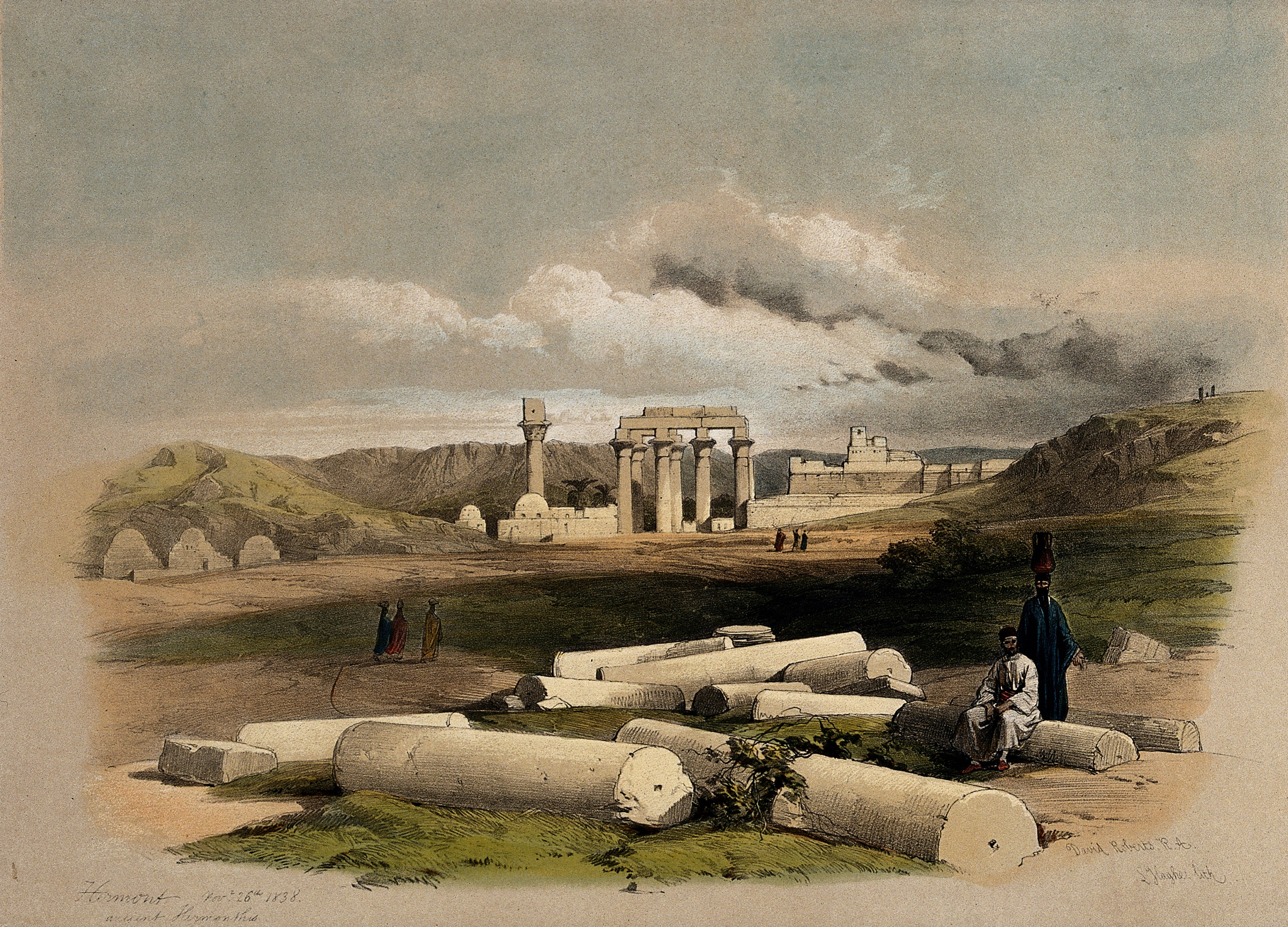
Ruins of Erment, 1840s, from The Holy Land, Syria, Idumea, Arabia, Egypt, and Nubia

The Ancient Egyptian name for the city meant "the Heliopolis of Montu", an Egyptian god whose root of name means "nomad". Montu was associated with raging bulls, strength and war. He was also said to manifest himself in a white bull with a black face, which was referred to as the Bakha. Egypt's greatest general-kings called themselves Mighty Bulls, the sons of Montu. In the famous narrative of the Battle of Kadesh, Ramesses II was said to have seen the enemy and "raged at them like Montu, Lord of Thebes".

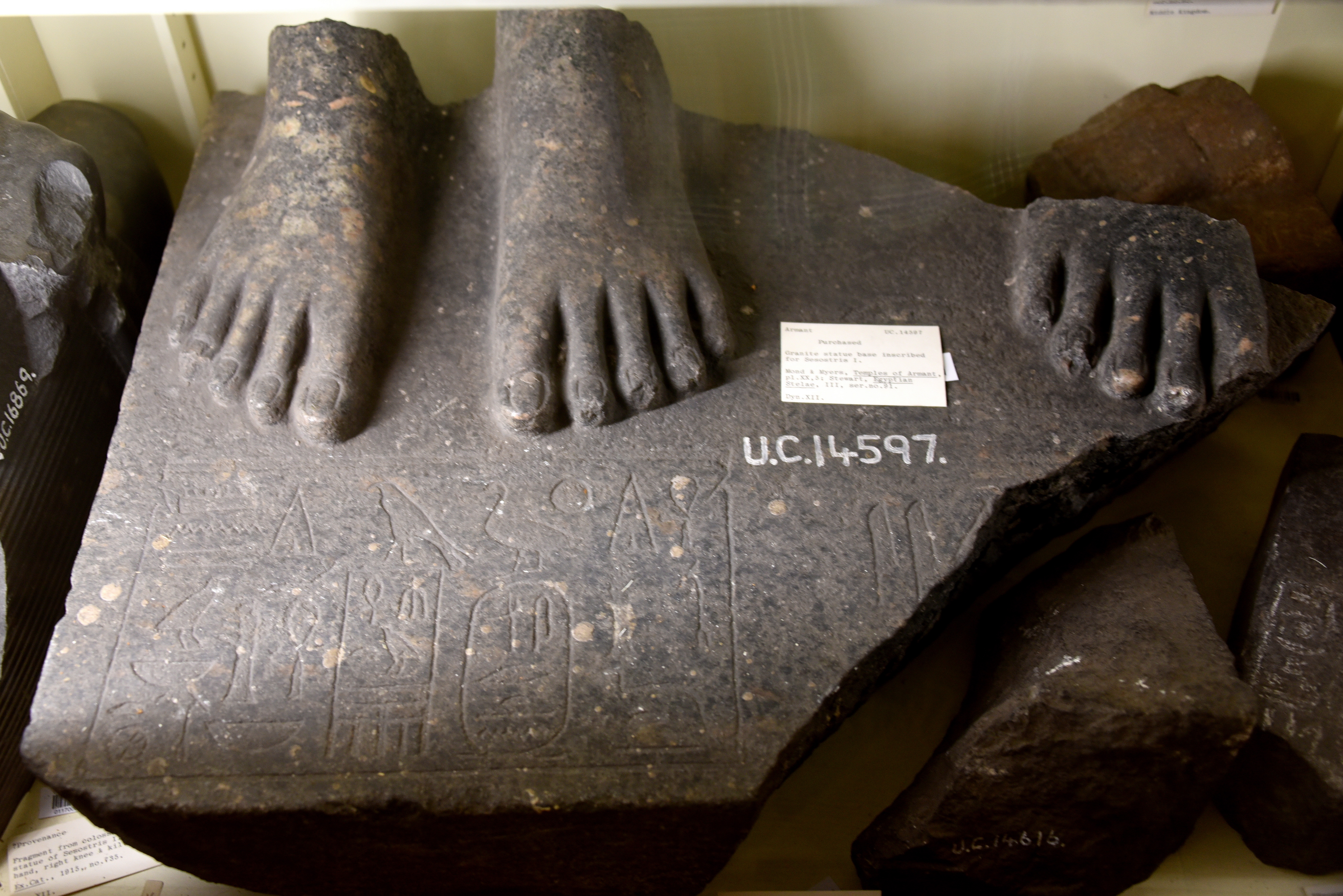
Base of a granite statue inscribed with the name of Senusret I. Two feet of a female figure, at the right side of the right foot of the king. From Armant, Egypt

A temple dedicated to Montu existed at Hermonthis as early as the Eleventh Dynasty, which perhaps originated at Hermonthis. Nebhepetre Mentuhotep II is the earliest builder known with certainty. Important additions were made during the Twelfth dynasty and during the New Kingdom. Destroyed during the Late Period, a new temple was started in the reign of Nectanebo II and was continued by the Ptolemies. Cleopatra VII and Ptolemy XV Caesarion added a birth house with a sacred lake. The building remained visible until the nineteenth century, when it was recycled to build a sugar factory. Only the remains of the pylon of Thutmose III are visible today.

Two gates, one of them built by Antoninus Pius, have also been found. The Bucheum, the burial place of the sacred Buchis bulls of Hermonthis, is on the desert edge north of the city. The earliest bull burial dates to Nectanebo II, and the complex remained in use until the mid 4th century AD. The burial place of the Mother of Buchis cows has also been located. Extensive cemeteries of all periods are found in the neighbourhood of Hermonthis.

Under Cleopatra VII, Hermonthis became the capital of the 4th Upper Egyptian nome. The city remained in use during the Coptic era.

Zeus and Apollo were worshipped there, both had the epithet Hermonthitis (Ἑρμωνθίτης). There was also a sanctuary of Isis.

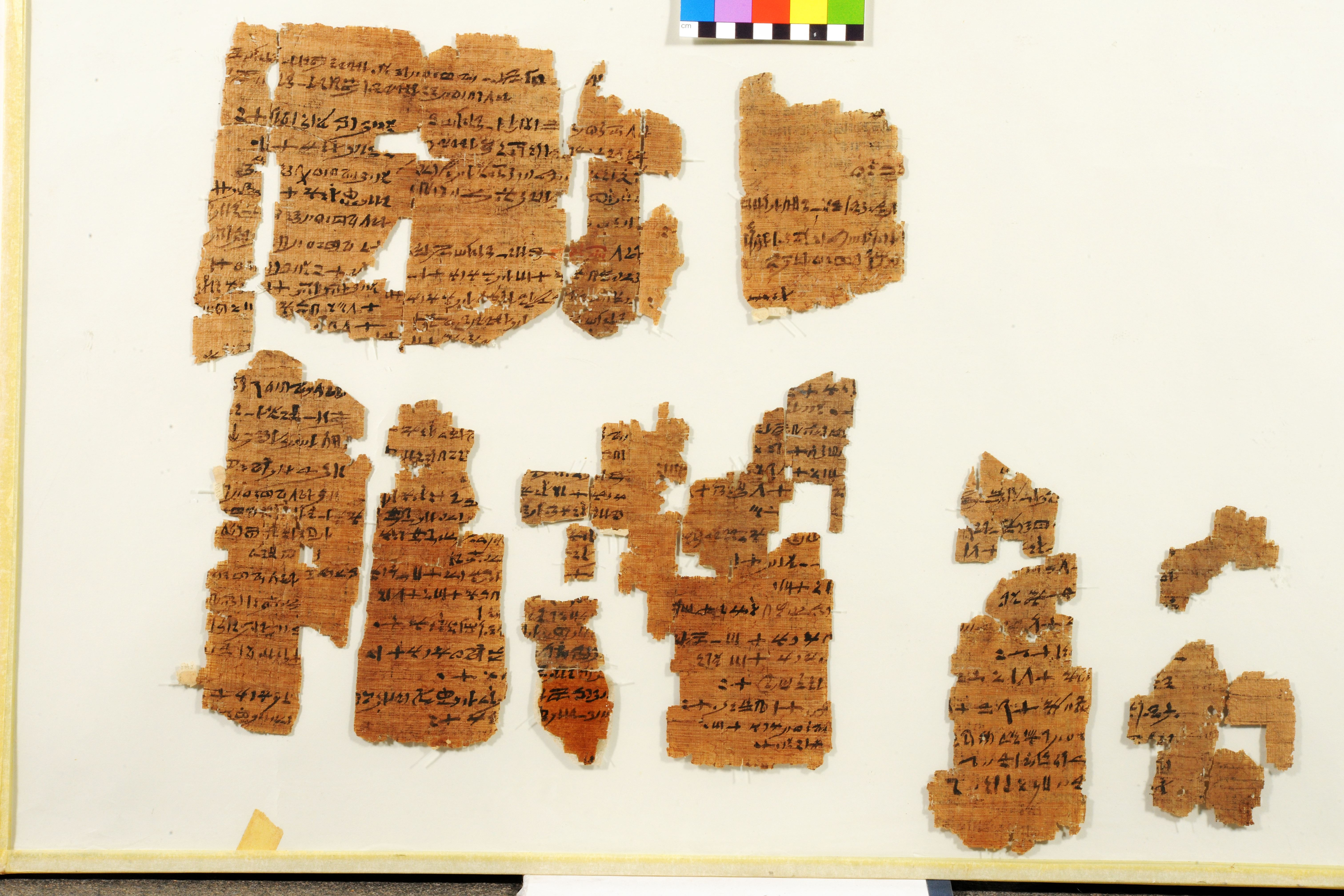
Papyrus containing the calendar of festivals of the temple of Montu at Armant. Between 1190 and 1077 BC, New Kingdom. Museo Egizio, Turin.

== See also ==
- List of ancient Egyptian towns and cities
