= Mnevis =

Ancient Egyptian deity

Name in hieroglyphs
wr r O5 t y E1
- Major cult center: Heliopolis
- Symbol: black bull, solar disk
- Offspring: Apis (according to the priesthood of Mnevis)

Mnevis (Ancient Greek: Μνέυις, Coptic: ⲉⲙⲛⲉⲩⲓ) is the Hellenized name of an ancient Egyptian bull god which had its centre of worship at Heliopolis, and was known to the ancient Egyptians as Mer-wer or Nem-wer.

Although initially a separate god, it was later assimilated to the syncretized god Atum-Ra as his physical manifestation, and also considered as the ba of Ra. Mnevis is often depicted as a black bull wearing a solar disk and uraeus. As reported by Plutarch, the Mnevis bull was second only to the Memphite Apis bull in importance. Similarly to the Apis bull, the Mnevis bull's movements were thought to be driven by divine will, and used as an oracle. The priesthood of Mnevis also went as far as to claim that Mnevis was none other than the father of the more famous Apis.

The Mnevis bull was entitled to two concubines, more precisely two cows representing Hathor and Iusaaset. When the bull died, he was embalmed and buried with all honours in a dedicated necropolis which was located not far from the temple at Heliopolis. Another burial ground was reserved for the so-called Mothers of Mnevis, which were considered the embodiment of the cow-goddess Hesat. After a Mnevis bull's death a replacement for him was sought, usually a completely black bull. There was only ever one Mnevis bull at a time.

The cult of Mnevis was among the very few to be tolerated during the "Amarna heresy" of King Akhenaten, probably because of its solar attributes. It is known that Akhenaten ordered the construction of a necropolis for Mnevis bulls in Akhetaten, although it has not yet been found.

== See also ==
- Auðumbla
- Buchis
- Bull of Heaven
- Kao (bull)
