= Sia (disambiguation) =

Sia (born 1975) is an Australian singer and songwriter.

Sia or SIA may also refer to:

== Organizations ==
- Safety Investigation Authority, a Finnish national board for incident investigation
- Secret Intelligence Australia, a British World War II intelligence unit
- Security Industry Association, for makers and handlers of electronic and physical security products
- Security Industry Authority, a British licensing authority for the private-security industry
- Securities Industry Association, in finance
- Semiconductor Industry Association
- Smithsonian Institution Archives
- Societe Internationale d’Acupuncture, a defunct French research organization
- Society for Industrial Archeology, a North American nonprofit organization
- Solidaridad Internacional Antifascista, a Spanish anarchist humanitarian organisation that existed during the Spanish Civil War
- Survivors of Incest Anonymous
- Service d'information aéronautique, the French Aeronautical Information Service

=== Businesses ===
- Service in Informatics and Analysis, provided batch and remote terminal access to mainframe computers, from 1967 to the early 1990s
- SIA Ltd, suppliers of geographic information software and services
- SOCO International (London stock exchange symbol SIA), an international oil and gas exploration and production company
- Sia Partners, a management consulting firm
- SIA S.p.A., an Italian information and communications technology company

==== Transportation ====
- Società Italiana Aviazione, a subsidiary of Fiat that built aircraft and aero engines between 1914 and 1918
- Subaru of Indiana Automotive, Inc., formerly Subaru-Isuzu Automotive, Inc.
- Seychelles International Airways, a former charter airline
- SIA, ICAO code for Singapore Airlines
- SIA, IATA code for Xi'an Xiguan Airport

== Places ==
- Sia (Pisidia), a town of ancient Pisidia, now in Turkey
- Sia, Cyprus, a village
- Sia, an ancient pieve (church with a baptistery) in Corsica

== People ==
- Sia Anagnostopoulou (born 1959), Greek politician and academic
- Sia Berkeley (born 1985), English actress
- Sia Figiel (1967–2026), Samoan novelist, poet and painter
- Sia Kamanor, Sierra Leonean sprinter
- Sia Koroma (born 1958), Sierra Leonean biochemist and psychiatric nurse; wife of Sierra Leonean President Ernest Bai Koroma
- Sia Michel, American journalist
- Sia Tolno (born 1975), Guinean singer and composer
- Beau Sia (born 1976), American slam poet
- Edgar Sia (born 1977), Filipino billionaire property developer

== Other uses ==
- Sia (god), a deification of wisdom in Egyptian mythology
- Sia (insect), a genus of insect
- Self-indication assumption, a philosophical principle
- Social impact assessment, a methodology
- Sia (title), a hereditary title in colonial Indonesia
- Style Icon Asia, formerly Style Icon Awards, an awards ceremony

== See also ==
- Zia (disambiguation)
