= Ziya =

Ziya (IPA: [ˈziːja]) is a Turkish given name for males and females, it is of Arabic origin, in Turkish Ziya means light.

- Ziya Doğan, Turkish football manager
- Ziya Gökalp, Turkish sociologist
- Nazmi Ziya Güran, Turkish impressionist painter
- Ziya Hurşit, person executed for attempting an assassination against Mustafa Kemal Atatürk
- Ziya Movahed (born 1943), Iranian poet and philosopher
- Ziya Müezzinoğlu (1919–2020), Turkish economist, diplomat and politician
- Ziya Onis, Turkish economist
- Ziya Saylan, Turkish medical doctor
- Ziya Şengül, Turkish footballer
- Ziya Songülen, Turkish footballer
- Ziya Tong, television personality and producer
- Ziya Yildiz, Bosnian footballer

== Middle name ==
- Halit Ziya Uşaklıgil, Turkish author
- Hilmi Ziya Ülken (1901–1974), Turkish scholar

== Other uses ==
- Zia (disambiguation)
- Zija
