= Sedjem =

Ancient Egyptian deity

- Sedjem was depicted as a man with the hieroglyph for ear of a bovine above his head
Name in hieroglyphs
F21 A40

Sedjem (sḏm) was an ancient Egyptian god who, along with Irer, join Hu and Sia as creative powers of the gods. Sedjem, which literally translates to "hearing," first appeared as a scribe for Thoth and Seshat in the temples of Seti I and Ramesses II at Abydos.
