= Zialor =

Zialor is a surname. Notable people with the surname include:

- Laura Zialor (born 1998), English international athlete
- Marie-Celine Zialor, Seychellois politician
- Philip Zialor (born 1976), Seychellois former professional footballer
- Ramy Zialor (born 1960), Seychellois former boxer

== See also ==
- Ziaur
