= Zia =

Zia or ZIA (also spelled Ziya, Ḍiya, Dia or Diya) may refer to:

== People ==
- Zia (name), including a list of people and fictional characters with the name
  - A romanization of the Wu (Shanghainese) pronunciation of the Chinese surname Xie (謝)
- Zia people (New Mexico)
- Zia clan of the Diné, or Navajo, people
- Zia people (Papua New Guinea)
  - The Zia language of Papua New Guinea

== Acronyms ==
- Zamboanga International Airport, Philippines
- Zhukovsky International Airport, Russia
- Zia International Airport, Bangladesh, now Shahjalal International Airport
- ZIA, a musical group founded by Elaine Walker

== Other uses ==
- Zia (brachiopod), a genus of brachiopods
- Zia (novel), by Scott O'Dell
- Applebay Zia, a motor glider
- Zia, a small village on the Greek island of Kos
- Zia Pueblo, New Mexico, United States, a census-designated place, also a pueblo within the CDP
  - T'siya Day School, formerly spelled Zia Day School
- Zia Record Exchange, a regional chain of record shops located across the American Southwest

== See also ==
- Sia (disambiguation)
- Tzia or Zia (Greek: Τζια), an alternative name for Kea (island), Cyclades, Greece
- Ziya, the Turkish spelling of the Arabic name
- Ziaur a compound name beginning with "Zia"
- Ziauddin a common transliteration a common name
