= Saylan =

Saylan is a Turkish surname. Notable people with the surname include:

- Merryll Saylan (born 1936), American woodturner
- Türkan Saylan (1935–2009), Turkish physician, academic, writer, teacher, and social activist
- Ziya Saylan, Turkish medical doctor
