= Irer =

Ancient Egyptian deity

- Irer was depicted as a man with the hieroglyph for eye above his head
Name in hieroglyphs
D4 A40

Irer was an ancient Egyptian god who, along with Sedjem, join Hu and Sia as creative powers of the gods. Irer, which translates as "sight," first appears as a scribe, alongside Sedjem, for Thoth and Seshat in the temples of Seti I and Ramesses II at Abydos.
