= Zija =

Zija is a given name. Notable people with the name include:

- Zija Azizov (born 1998), Azerbaijani footballer
- Zija Dibra (1890–1940), Ottoman and Albanian officer and politician
- Zija Dizdarević (1916–1942), Bosnian writer
- Zija Grapshi (1931–2025), Albanian actor and puppeteer
