= Service in Informatics and Analysis =

Service in Informatics and Analysis (SIA Ltd.) was one of the pioneering time-sharing service bureau companies in the late 1960s, later known as SIA Computer Services. Its head office was located at Lower Belgrave Street, close to Victoria Station in London, and the company had branch offices in Edinburgh, Manchester, the West End, Paris and (much later) in Hong Kong. SIA offered terminal services via the Post Office telephone network at speeds of 10, 15, 30, 60 and 120 characters per second for Teletype-style terminals and of 1200 baud, 2400 baud and 4800 baud for Remote Job Entry terminals. Later, with the release of the IBM PC, systems were developed to emulate the Remote Batch and interactive terminals. Clients could also visit the head or branch offices to submit their jobs personally or have them accepted and supervised by the production department.

In 1968 the company installed a Control Data Corporation CDC 6600 mainframe computer – the first CDC 6600 installed in the United Kingdom. It was generally considered to be the first successful supercomputer, outperforming its fastest predecessor, IBM 7030 Stretch, by about three times. It remained the world's fastest computer from 1964 to 1969, when it relinquished that status to its successor, the CDC 7600. By 1974, SIA added more processing power by installing a Control Data Cyber-72 at Victoria.

SIA had assembled a comprehensive library of proven software packages drawn from all over the world. They covered a range of disciplines: electronics, management science, integrated survey and statistical, integrated cluster analysis, segmentation analysis, simulation, financial planning, production planning and control systems, civil and structural engineering, finite element stress analysis, box girder bridge design, highway engineering, business systems, business data processing, database management and many others.

== Client support groups ==
SIA's client support groups included:

=== Technical services ===
Supported clients writing and running their own programs, whether written in ALGOL, BASIC, COBOL, or Fortran. They provided training in all user aspects of the Kronos-75 service and on operating various types of terminal.

=== Commercial team ===
Supported the SIA sales accounting package and the database management system SYSTEM 2000. They also developed computer systems for various business applications to meet the individual needs of client organisations. Applications covered included invoicing, sales ledger, sales analysis, stock control, bill of material processing, library information retrieval and a wide range of database implementations characterised by the need to store quantities of data and to retrieve from it in a number of differing ways.

=== Management sciences team ===
Supported the statistics, linear programming, depot location and financial modelling packages offered. Production scheduling, warehouse siting, cash flow modelling and survey analysis are typical applications.

=== Engineering ===
Civil and structural support packages for bridge and building design and detailing, for soil mechanics and for other civil engineering applications.

=== Offshore engineering ===
Concentrated on the business of designing structures for use in offshore oil production. Waveloading, static and dynamic analyses, towing studies and stability problems were also covered.

=== Advanced structural analysis ===
Supported clients tackling problems with the help of finite element techniques and other analyses. Examples are drawn mostly from mechanical engineering – from nuclear power stations through aircraft and satellites to diesel engines.

=== Chemical engineering ===
Assisted process designers to use a powerful flowsheet simulator program, arguably the best in the world.

=== Highway engineering and mapping ===
Supported and developed a range of programs for use in highway design and in ground modelling and mapping. Programs developed by this team have helped British and foreign consultants to win highway design contracts in the Middle East since the design timescale is dramatically shortened by their use.

=== Transportation ===
Developed and maintained the TFA suite of programs for transportation planning studies and provided consultancy services.

=== Systems ===
The operating systems running on the Control Data 6600, Cyber-72 and later Cyber-175 included SCOPE, Kronos and later NOS. The source code was heavily modified for the business needs of the company by a team of systems programmers. Many of the concepts developed at SIA were incorporated in Control Data's later systems. SIA was a member of J.U.N.K (Joint Users of NOS and Kronos), a user group formed to share ideas and experiences using Control Data's software.

== History ==
- December 1967 – The company formed a subsidiary of the French-owned Metra Group of consultancy companies.
- September 1968 – Doors opened for business on a Control Data 6600, the largest and most powerful computer installed in the UK
- February 1969 – Installation of first RJE terminal linked by private Post Office telephone line – the beginning of SIA's long experience in remote computing.
- May 1970 – Manchester branch office opened.
- December 1970 – Turnover for the year exceeded £1 Million.
- March 1972 – Introduction of INTERCOM service for users with Teletype-style terminals.
- March 1972 – West End branch office opened.
- May 1973 – Edinburgh branch office opened.
- December 1974 – Second major computer (Cyber-72) installed. Turnover tops £2 Million.
- April 1975 – Launch of Kronos-75 integrated remote computing service, offering users Timesharing, Batch processing (local and remote) or a mixture of the two in one computer installation.
- August 1978 – SIA ordered a CDC Cyber-175, to be installed early 1979.
- May 1979 – Installed a high-speed link to CISI's IBM Network in France.
- 1988? – Installed a DEC VAX 8000, model 8550.

== Sources ==
- Much of what appears in this article has been collated from SIA's own publicity brochures, circa 1975, for example: Program Development at SIA
