= Zija Grapshi =

Albanian actor (1931–2025)

- Born: 19 March 1931; Gjirokastër, Albania
- Died: 17 August 2025 (aged 94); Tirana, Albania
- Occupation: Actor
- Years active: 1949–2025
- Awards: Merited Artist

Zija Grapshi (19 March 1931 – 17 August 2025) was an Albanian actor, renowned for his extensive work in theater, film, and voice acting. Over a career spanning more than four decades, he became a prominent figure in Albanian performing arts, particularly known for his contributions to the Puppet Theater of Tirana.

== Early life ==
Grapshi was born on 19 March 1931, in Gjirokastër, Albania. He completed his studies at the Jordan Misja Artistic Lyceum in 1952. His passion for the performing arts was evident early on, leading him to join the amateur theater group affiliated with Radio Tirana in 1949. This experience laid the foundation for his subsequent professional endeavors in acting.

== Career ==
Grapshi's professional career commenced in 1951 when he joined the Puppet Theater of Tirana. Over the next 40 years, he became one of its most distinguished actors, performing in over 160 productions. His portrayals of characters such as Shvejk in 1957, Ivan the Great in 1959, and Baba Viti in 1987 were particularly acclaimed, endearing him to audiences across generations.

In addition to his work in puppet theater, Grapshi was involved with the State Estrada and the National Theater, where he took on various roles, often depicting wise and endearing elderly characters. His distinctive voice and natural acting style also made him a sought-after voice actor, dubbing numerous characters in animated films and radio dramas.

Beyond acting, Grapshi contributed to the arts as a director, overseeing more than 20 productions at the National Puppet Theater. He also served as a lecturer at the Higher Institute of Arts from 1967, mentoring a new generation of Albanian performers.

His film appearances, though less frequent, included roles in Kur zbardhi një ditë (1971), Shtigje lufte (1974), and Në pyjet me borë ka jetë (1978), among others. In these films, he was noted for his authentic portrayals and the unique depth he brought to his characters.

== Personal life and death ==
In recognition of his significant contributions to Albanian arts and culture, Zija Grapshi was honored with the title "Merited Artist of Albania."

Grapshi died on 17 August 2025, at the age of 94. He was one of the last surviving actors of Albanian classic cinema and early members of the Puppet Theatre.
