= Sia (Pisidia) =

Former populated places in Turkey

Coordinates: 37°15′43″N 30°36′08″E

Sia was a town of ancient Pisidia inhabited during Hellenistic, Roman, and Byzantine times.

Its site is located near Karaot, in Asiatic Turkey.

From Smithsonian Magazine, June 2024:

"Founded during the Hellenistic period, [Sia] otherwise remains a mystery. 'All the ancient sources are silent about Sia, as if it never existed,' [Umit] Isin[, founder of Equinox Travel] said. 'Arrian and other historians talk about wars, roads and trade in Pisidia—but not one mentions this name.'

"Yet Sia undoubtedly grew into an important polis. Immense blocks of stone from Hellenistic and Roman structures were strewn across the forest floor, possibly toppled by an earthquake, and several intact walls rose around them."

The article notes that the only evidence that exists of the city's name is a temple lintel inscription, "HO DEMOS HO SIENOI": "The people of Sia."
