= Hu (mythology) =

Ancient Egyptian deity

- Hu was depicted as a man with a modified hieroglyph for tongue above his head
Name in hieroglyphs
H w R8

Hu (ḥw), in ancient Egypt, was "the personification of a religious term, the creative utterance" and closely connected to Sia. Hu was deification of the first word, the word of creation, that Atum was said to have exclaimed upon ejaculating in his masturbatory act of creating the Ennead.

Hu is mentioned already in the Old Kingdom Pyramid Texts (PT 251, PT 697) as companion of the deceased pharaoh. Together with Sia, he was depicted in the retinue of Thoth.

In the Middle Kingdom, all gods participated in Hu and Sia, and were associated with Ptah who created the universe by uttering the word of creation. Hu was rarely depicted visually, when Hu was depicted it would be as an anthropomorphic deity.

In the New Kingdom, both Hu and Sia together with Heka, Irer and Sedjem were members of the creative powers of Amun-Ra. By the time of Ptolemaic Egypt, Hu had merged with Shu (air).

== See also ==
- Logos
