= Ziya Saylan =

Medical doctor

- Occupations: Physician, cosmetic surgeon
- Organization: European Academy of Cosmetic Surgery

Ziya Saylan is a Turkish medical doctor and former president of the European Academy of Cosmetic Surgery, based in Düsseldorf, Germany. In June 2004, he announced a procedure utilizing titanium/polypropylene mesh inserts to perform breast reconstruction, anchoring the "internal bra" to the ribs and muscle tissue. The procedure has been used on at least three dozen women to date. Medical evidence regarding the safety of this procedure is still being compiled; however the technique of using titanium/polypropylene mesh in reconstructive surgery for hernias has been in use in Europe for years, and is approved for use for this purpose in the United States.
