= Ziaur =

Ziaur is a given name. Notable people with the name include:

- Ziaur Rahman (1936–1981), Bangladeshi war hero, politician and statesman
- Ziaur Rahman (born 1972), medical scientist from India
- Ziaur Rahman (chess player) (1974-2024), chess player from Bangladesh
- Ziaur Rahman (cricketer) (born 1986), cricketer from Bangladesh
- Ziaur Rahman Ziaur (born 1981), Bangladeshi kabaddi player
- Ziaur Rashid, cricketer from Bangladesh
