= Sia (god) =

Ancient Egyptian deity

- Sia was depicted as a man with the hieroglyph of the same name above his head
Name in hieroglyphs
N39 A2 or Z2ss A2 or S32 A2

Sia or Saa, an ancient Egyptian god, was the deification of perception in the Heliopolitan Ennead cosmogony and is likely equivalent to the "intellectual energies of the heart of Ptah in the Memphite theology." He also had a connection with writing and was often shown in anthropomorphic form holding a papyrus scroll. This papyrus was thought to embody intellectual achievements.

The god personifies the perceptive mind. In ancient Egyptian mythology, Sia was believed to have been created from blood that dripped from the phallus of Ra. In the Old Kingdom, Sia was often depicted on the right side of Ra, holding his sacred papyrus.

In the New Kingdom, Sia is depicted in the solar barque in the underworld texts and tomb decorations, together with Hu, the "creative utterance," and Heka, the god of magic. These gods were seen as special powers helping the creator, and although Heka had his own cult Sia did not.

== Hieroglyph: Sia ==
The Sia (hieroglyph) was also used to represent "to perceive", "to know" or "to be cognizant".
