= Wadjet =

Ancient Egyptian goddess, symbolizing Lower Egypt

- An illustration of Wadjet based on depictions in tombs.
Name in hieroglyphs
I13
- Major cult center: Buto
- Symbol: Egyptian cobra

Map of the Nile Delta locating Buto.

Wadjet (/ˈwædʒət/; Ancient Egyptian: wꜢḏyt "Green One"), known to the Greek world as Uto (/ˈjuːtoʊ/; Koine Greek: Οὐτώ) or Buto (/ˈbjuːtoʊ/; Βουτώ) among other renderings including Wedjat, Uadjet, and Udjo, was originally the ancient Egyptian local goddess of the city of Dep or Buto in Lower Egypt, which was an important site in prehistoric Egypt. Wadjet's worship originally started in the Predynastic period, but evolved over time from a local goddess to a patron goddess.

Wadjet was closely associated in ancient Egyptian religion with the Eye of Ra and the Eye of Horus symbols, each powerful protective deities. The hieroglyph for her eye is shown below; sometimes two are shown in the sky of religious images. There is little consensus on which eye is truly tied to Wadjet as both have some importance to her. The main differences between her eyes are which side of the face they are on, left or right. The color of these eyes in amulets and ceramics are usually created in vibrant blue and green colors, which resemble the goddess's name of "the green one". The green Wadjet eye amulets found in Egyptian daily life provided a token of fertility and protection to those who had them.

== Etymology ==
The name Wadjet is derived from the term for the symbol of her domain, Lower Egypt, the papyrus. Its hieroglyphs differ from those of the Green Crown or Deshret of Lower Egypt only by the determinative, which in the case of the crown was a picture of the Green Crown and, in the case of the goddess, a rearing cobra. The transliteration of the various eyes that Wadjet is associated with (Wedjat-eye) refers to the name the "Intact-one". Wadjet's name ends with a T, signifying her being a feminine presence rather than a male presence that some claim she is. Other names for Wadjet include: Wedjat, Wadjit, Wadjyt, Uto, Buto, Uatchet, and Edjo.

== History ==
Wadjet was said to be the matron and protector of Lower Egypt in her cobra form, and upon unification with her sister Nekhbet, Goddess of Upper Egypt, the joint protector and patron of all of Egypt. Scenes of the two sisters together as two cobras can be found in King Sety I's tomb, located in the Valley of the Kings. The image of Wadjet with the sun disk is called the uraeus, and it was the emblem on the crown of the rulers of Lower Egypt. She was also the protector of kings and of women in childbirth, tasked with guarding them from enemies that could harm them.

Wadjet's family history is largely unconfirmed, mainly found through myth and word of mouth. In one myth, Wadjet was said to be Ra's Daughter, where she was depicted as his seeing eye. Her job was to find Shu and Tefnut for him, to which she successfully did. Her father was very proud of her and honored her by commanding that she stay with him to protect him from enemies. She took her most recognizable form as a snake and struck any enemies that tried to hurt her father. She was also in charge of carrying out Ra's orders. This myth is represented by triadic seals, amulets, and more, depicting the family of gods together, including Ra as the father, Wadjet as the daughter, and Seth as Ra's bodyguard. A clear example of these three gods being tied together was found on a Triad amulet in Tel Azekah.

In another myth, Wadjet was said to be the nurse of the infant god Horus. With the help of his mother Isis, they protected Horus from his treacherous uncle, Set, when they took refuge in the swamps of the Nile Delta.

Wadjet and Nekhbet have been portrayed as nurses to the various kings in the afterlife, breastfeeding him in order to sustain his royal qualities. These two goddesses appear in the Pyramid Texts, maintaining the king's divinity through suckling while he is in a child-like state. A similar portrayal of Wadjet as a nurse, found in the tomb of Tutankhamun on a pendant, instead depicts the King as fully grown and standing straight up while being breastfed. He is dressed in his traditional royal attire, using the Goddess's milk to help him be successful in his position of king. This pendant of Wadjet and the king was found in the context of funerary rituals and could serve multiple purposes of both resurrection and coronation. This imagery is also found in King Pepy II's funerary temple, which shows a damaged relief of Wadjet nursing the king.

Wadjet's oracle was in the renowned temple in Per-Wadjet that was dedicated to her worship and gave the city its name. This oracle may have been the source for the oracular tradition that spread to Greece from Egypt. From around the 4th dynasty onward, Wadjet was claimed as the patron goddess and protector of the whole of Lower Egypt. She became associated with Nekhbet, depicted as a white vulture, who held unified Egypt. After the unification the image of Nekhbet joined Wadjet on the crown, thereafter shown as part of the uraeus. The religious epithet for these patron deities of the entire county was, "nebty ('Two Ladies')".

Wadjet, as the goddess of Lower Egypt, had a large temple at the ancient Imet (now Tell Nebesha) in the Nile Delta. She was worshipped in the area as the "Lady of Imet". Later she was joined by Min and Horus to form a triad of deities. From the site of Tebtunis, in the Egyptian Faiyum, a temple is dedicated to Wadjet and was the site of ritual performance in her honor.

According to ancient Greece, Wadjet was present in their mythology as well. Known as Buto, Uto, Leto or Latona, the goddess was one of the focal points for the town of Buto, as mentioned above.

== Appearance ==
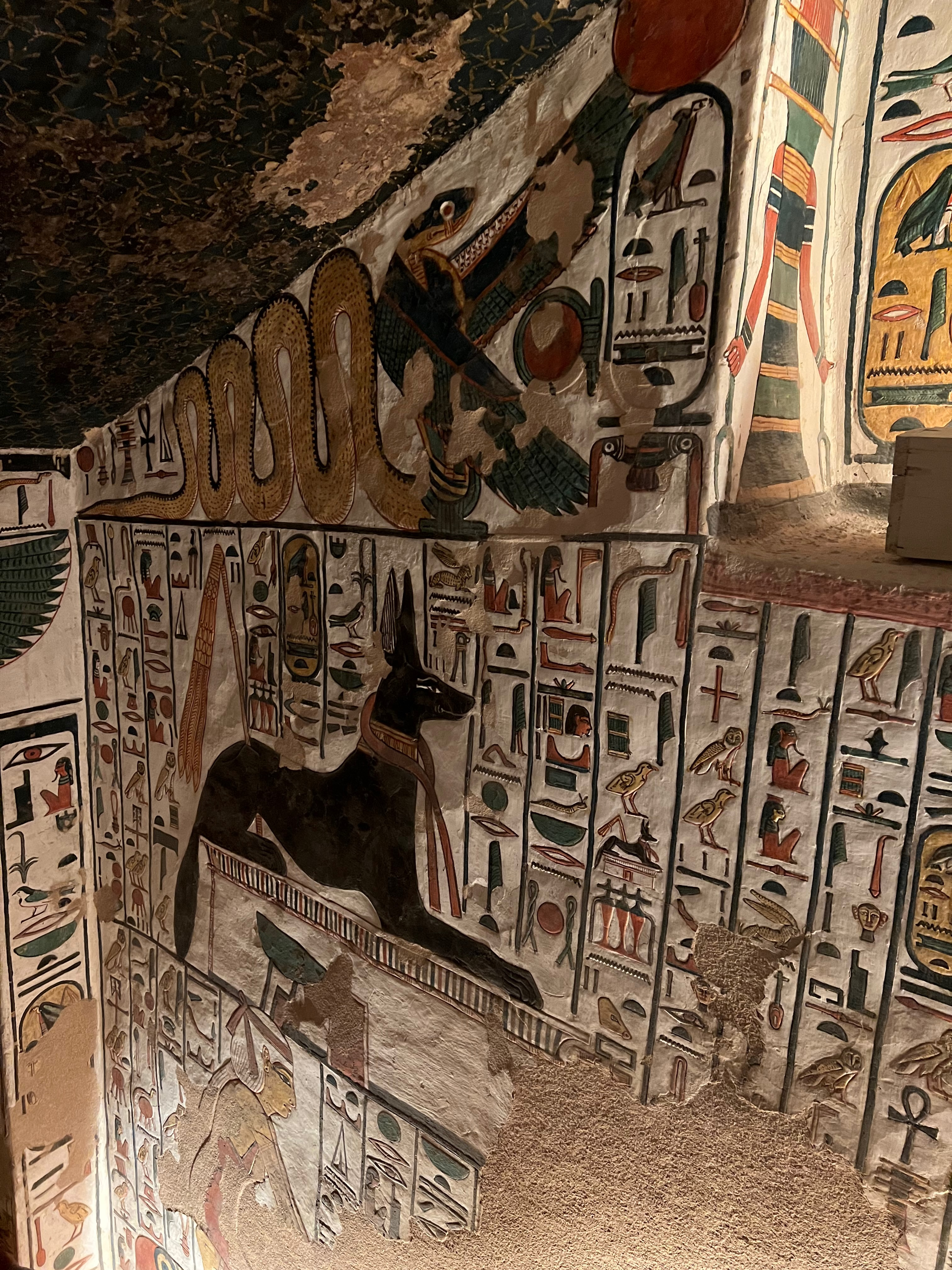
Wadjet in the form of a winged cobra, depicted in the Tomb of Nefertari, above Anubis (Jackal-like).

The Egyptian word wꜣḏ signifies blue and green. It is also the name for the well-known "Eye of the Moon". Wadjet was usually depicted as an Egyptian cobra, a venomous snake common to the region. In later times, she was often depicted simply as a woman with a snake's head, a woman wearing the uraeus, or a lion headed goddess often wearing the uraeus. The uraeus originally had been her body alone, which wrapped around or was coiled upon the head of the pharaoh or another deity. In her snake form, she was depicted as striking and biting those who try to harm the King, which is why she is featured as a protective symbol on crown emblems and amulets. Wadjet is also depicted as an Egyptian cobra with large, colorful wings. She is shown in her signature green and blue colors on the snake hood and wing feathers, but she is also shown with vibrant red and gold colors that scale down to the snake's tail. Gold commonly represented the gods and goddesses eternal flesh, while red represented danger and fire to signify something as a threat. A decorative panel depicting Wadjet's cobras was found in the Maru-Aten Temple in a darker colored granite. This darkened material helps historians infer that a yellow quartzite color was present, representing the color of the sun and the eternal flesh. Later Wadjet often was shown coiled upon the head of Ra; in order to act as his protector, this image of her became the uraeus symbol used on the royal crowns as well.

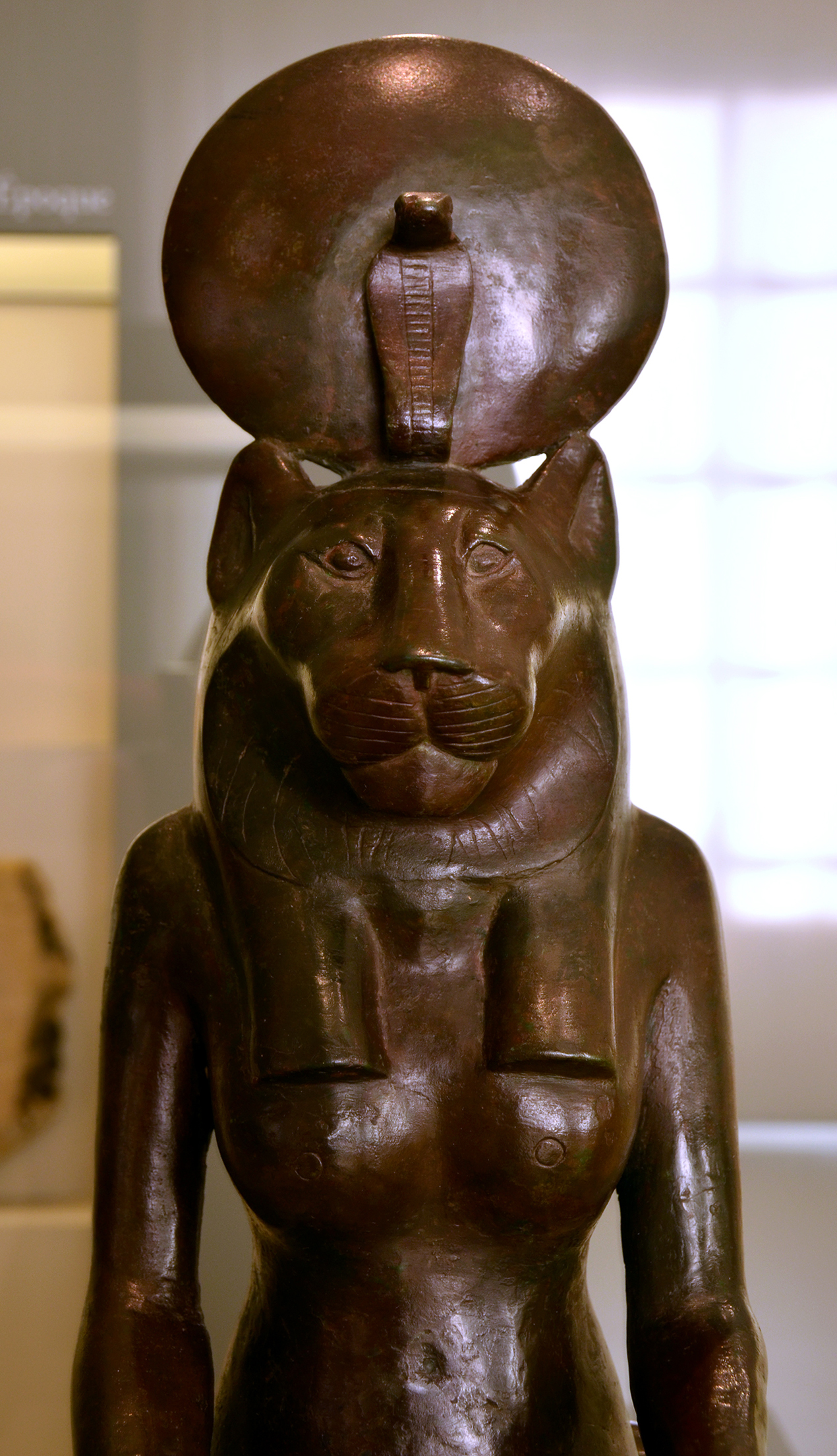
Wadjet, depicted as a lioness, with a rearing cobra on her crown.

Another early depiction of Wadjet is as a cobra entwined around a papyrus stem, beginning in the Predynastic era (prior to 3100 B.C.) and it is thought to be the first image that shows a snake entwined around a staff symbol. This is a sacred image that appeared repeatedly in the later images and myths of cultures surrounding the Mediterranean Sea, called the caduceus, which may have had separate origins. Her image also rears up from the staff of the "flagpoles" that are used to indicate deities, as seen in the hieroglyph for "uraeus" and for "goddess" in other places.

Similar to her sister, Nekhbet, Wadjet can also be found in the form of a vulture. It is less common to find her in this form as her cobra form is more popular in order to represent protection. However some reliefs do depict Wadjet in her avian form hovering over the heads of kings and pharaohs.

Wadjet is occasionally depicted as other animal-headed beings or as other animals such as a lion or mongoose. Notably, the depiction of the mongoose serves as an antithesis to that of the cobra, as it is a natural predator. Some statues of Wadjet are argued to contain mongoose remains however confirmation on this being forensic or a visual observation is unknown.

When Wadjet is depicted as a lion, she is usually seated in the bronze statues that represent her. She is in a relaxed position with her mouth closed and her arms at her side, which is very different from her other depictions as a snake rearing at enemies. An explanation for her depiction as a lion-headed goddess may stem from the goddess Sekhmet through association as a powerful or dangerous goddess. Some historians are not sure that these bronze statues are of Wadjet, but instead of the goddess Sekhmet.

At times she was depicted wearing the Red Crown of Lower Egypt. Wadjet was depicted many times in her cobra form alongside her Upper Egyptian counterpart Nekhbet, in her vulture form wearing the Red Crown on wall paintings or on the pharaoh's headdress.

In the relief shown in the gallery, which is on the wall of the Mortuary Temple of Hatshepsut at Luxor, there are two images of Wadjet: one of her as the Uraeus with her head through an ankh and another where she precedes a Horus hawk wearing the pschent, representing the pharaoh whom she protects.

Eye of Horus on the left side.

== Protector of country, pharaohs, and other deities ==
Wadjet was associated with the Nile Delta region and more associated with the world of the living than that of the dead. She was closely linked to pharaohs as a protective deity.

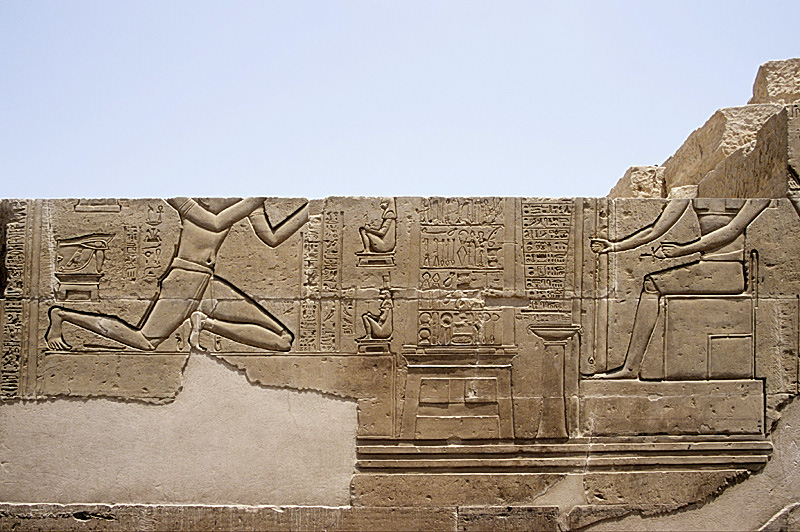
Depiction of pharaoh presenting the Wadjet eyes (this portion no longer survives), to the god Haroeris so that he will ritually cleanse them. This is found within an inscription within the relief. From the Temple of Kom Ombo.

Wadjet is found in several different burial sites of both Kings and Queens in order to symbolize protection. Notably, she is found in Queen consort Nefertari's tomb in a rearing position wearing a double crown, or Pschent. The Pschent depicts the unity of Lower and Upper Egypt into one. These crowns are usually found in the tombs of royalty in order to show control over the entirety of Egypt. Along with her double crown, Wadjet is posed holding a Was-sceptre, a valued symbol of authority or divine power. All of these sacred items Wadjet is posed with help to provide protection over the royal family, and in this case, the royal family is of King Ramesses II and Queen consort Nefertari.

Aside from Nefertari's tomb, Wadjet is also found in King Seti I's Tomb, along with her sister Nekhbet. The two sisters are seen on each side of King Sety's name, providing full protection to him as he rules over Egypt. The unification of the sisters shows Sety I's control over all of Egypt, not just of Lower or Upper Egypt.

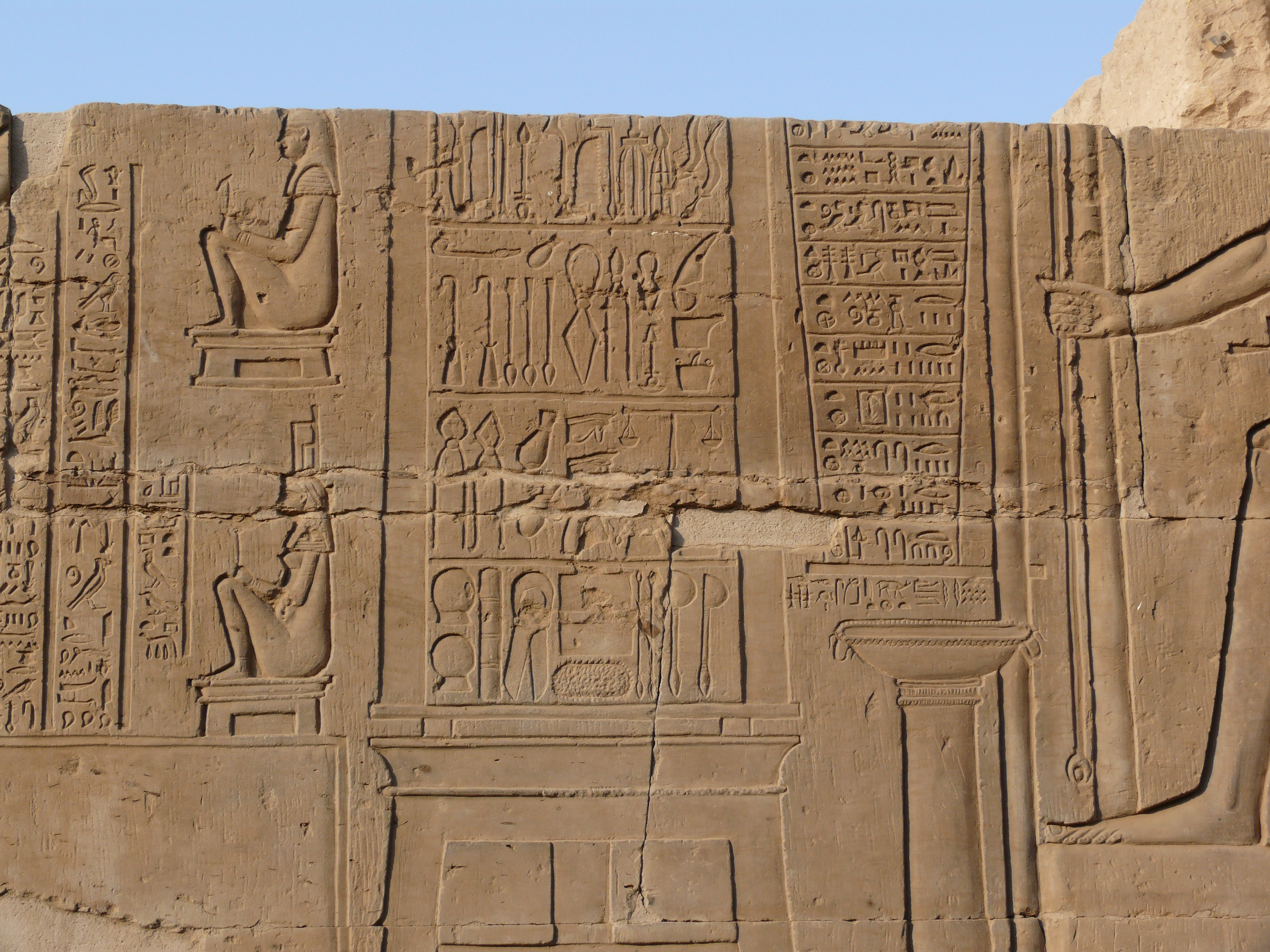
Engraving of surgical instruments including the Wadjet eye, from the Temple of Kom Ombo.

Wadjet, as mentioned above, is often depicted as a winged cobra. These wings serving a dual purpose as a protective embrace and being capable of creating the breath of life often connected to the image of the Ankh that she is often depicted with. Both of these uses are vital in surviving the afterlife.

From the Temple of Kom Ombo, an engraving depicts surgical equipment, among which is a set of 'Wadjet eyes' denoting its uses as a medical item and Wadjet's role as a protector deity. Within the wider relief is contained a depiction of a Roman pharaoh offering the Wadjet Eyes to Haroeris and Senetneferet (meaning the good sister), his consort. While only the lower portion of the relief remains, its inscription describes the pharaoh's desire for Haroeris to cleanse the eyes symbolizing the two halves of Egypt and in turn restore Egypt itself. Once again this denotes Wadjet's role as a protector and unifier of Egypt.

== Wadjet in modern media ==
Like many aspects of Egyptology, mass media tends to incorporate Egyptian influences into video games, movies and much more. Wadjet is no exception to this rule and is referenced in countless different forms of modern media.

- Wadjet's symbolism through the Eye of Ra appears in the video game Overwatch 2 underneath the character "Pharah's" eye.
- Wadjet's symbolism through the Eye of Horus appears in the video game Overwatch 2 underneath the character "Ana (Overwatch)"'s eye.
- Wadjet appears as the protector of Lower Egypt in The Crown of Ptolemy (March 31, 2015), by Rick Riordan.
- Wadjet's symbolism as the Eye of Horus appears within the quest, "The Curse of Wadjet", in the video game Assassin's Creed Origins.
- Wadjet appears in the board game Wadjet (board game) (1996), where she attempts to stop the explorers (players) from entering her tomb.
- Wadjet appears as a playable unit in Age of Mythology (2002) for the Egyptian Faction
- The video game studio Wadjet Eye Games is named for Wadjet and the associated eye symbolism
- A truncation of the Eye of Ra appears in the video game Mirror's Edge as the protagonist Faith Connor's eye tattoo. Missing the cerebellum spiral perhaps as a double meaning, the character herself is the motion of the city and thus represents the cerebellum, and conversely the city is lacking freedom of movement. Similarly, the word EVE is a truncation of the word EYE, or a wadjet missing its optic nerve.

== Other uses ==
The Nazit Mons, a mountain on Venus, is named for Nazit, an "Egyptian winged serpent goddess". According to Elizabeth Goldsmith, the Greek name for Nazit was Buto.

== Gallery ==
D10
Wadjet - Eye of Horus
in hieroglyphs

Wadjet as a woman

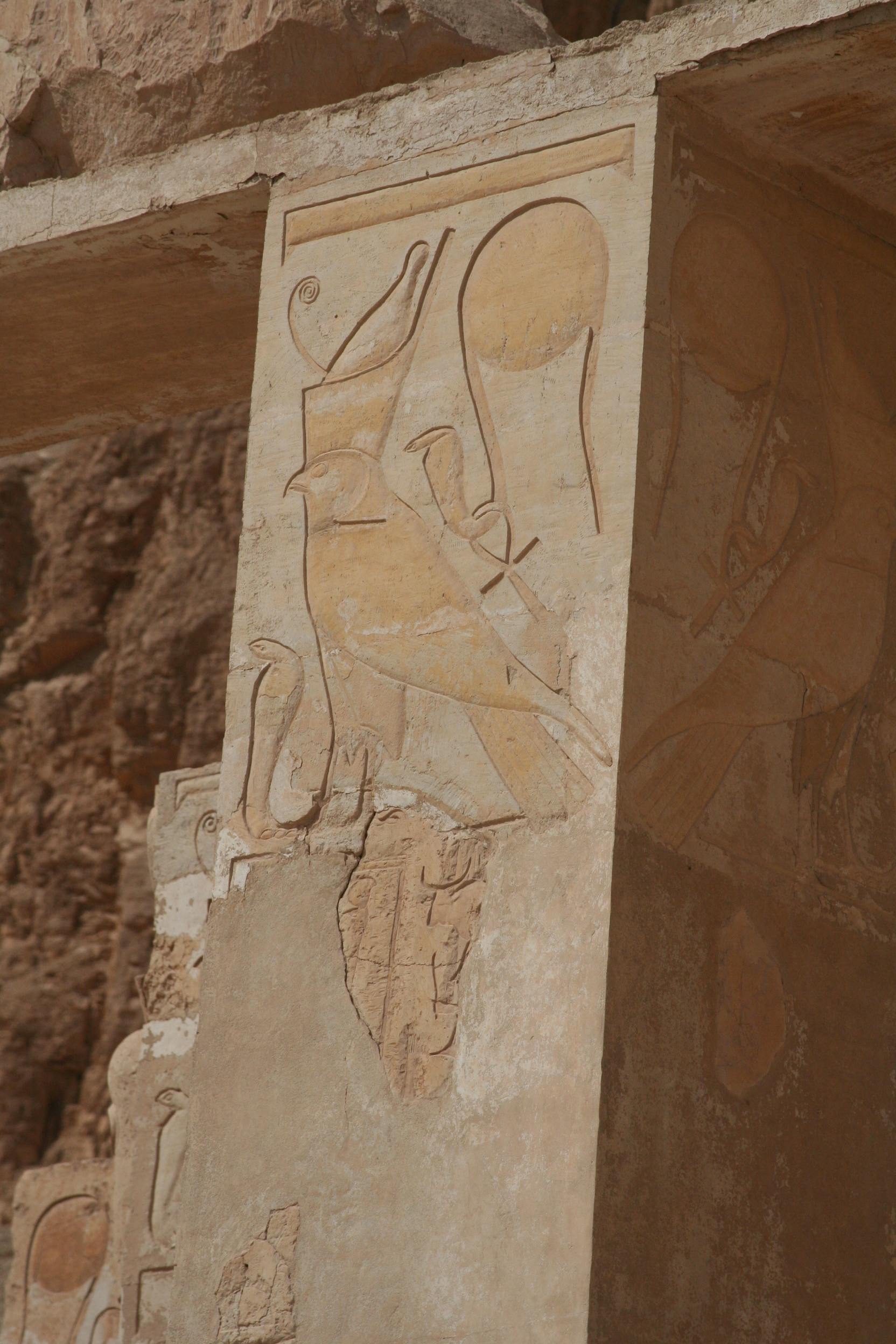
Two images of Wadjet appear on this carved wall in the mortuary temple of Hatshepsut at Luxor.

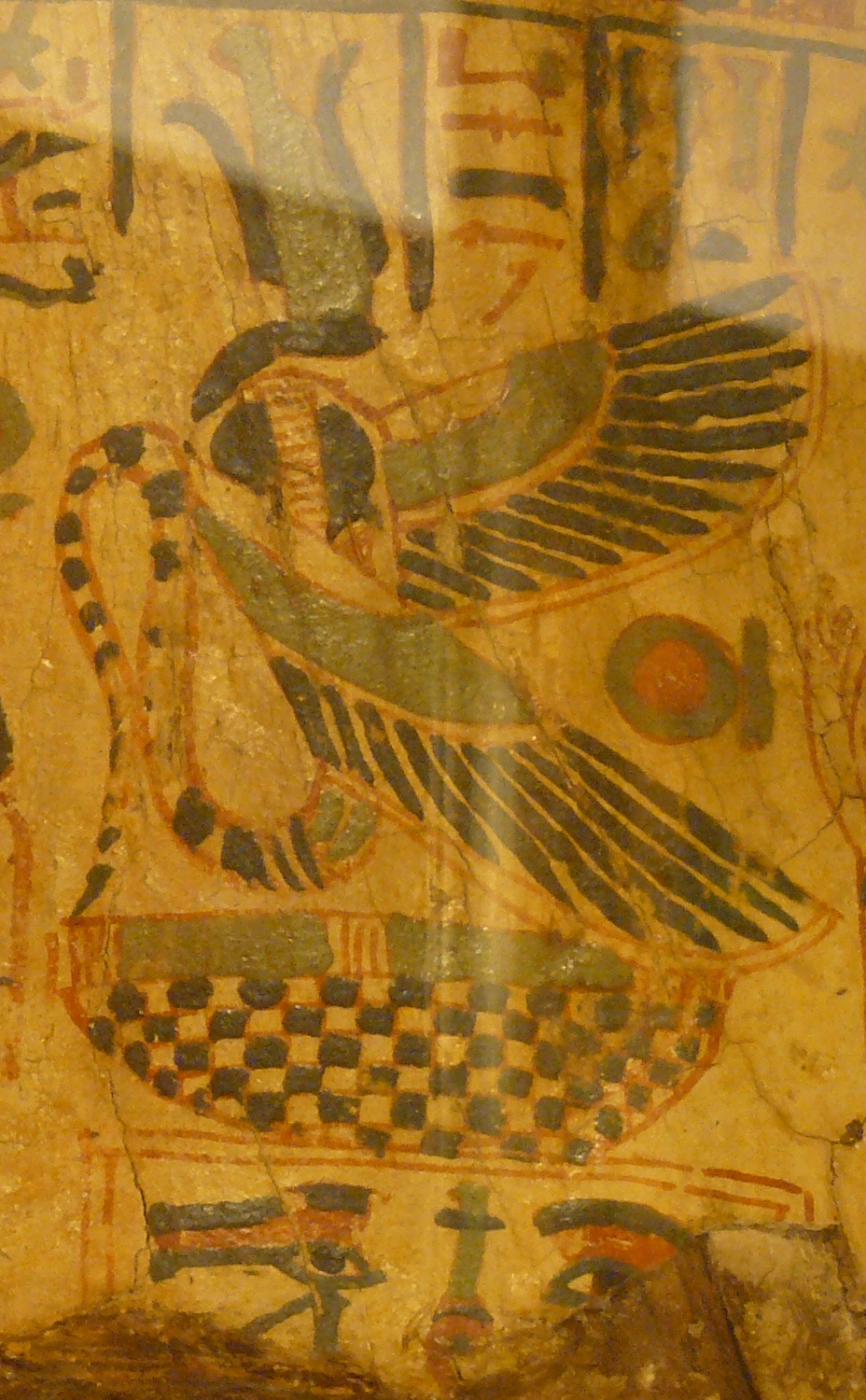
Wadjet painted on a coffin wearing the Atef crown

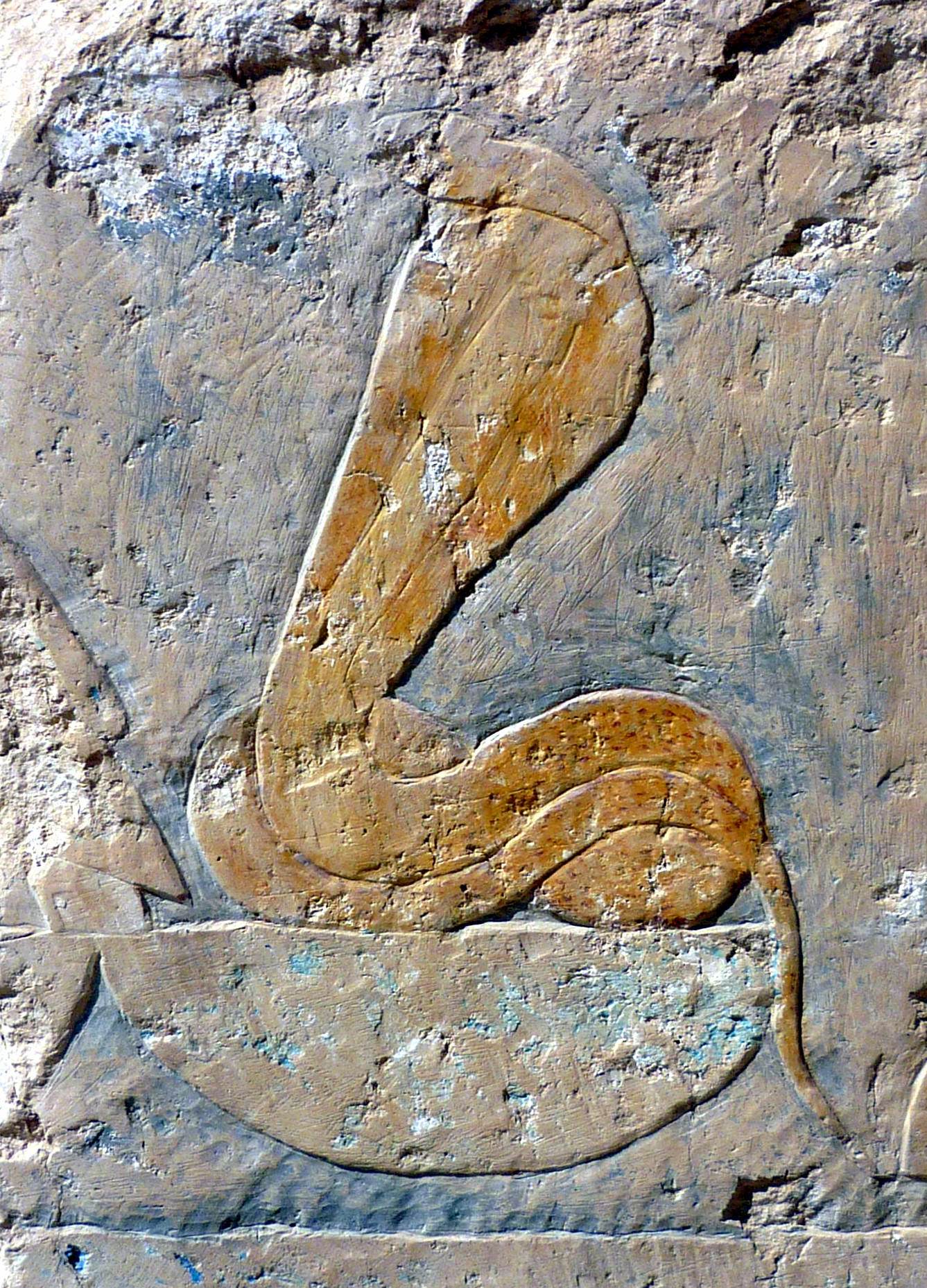
Wadjet depicted alongside Nekhbet on a block from the mortuary temple of Hatshepsut

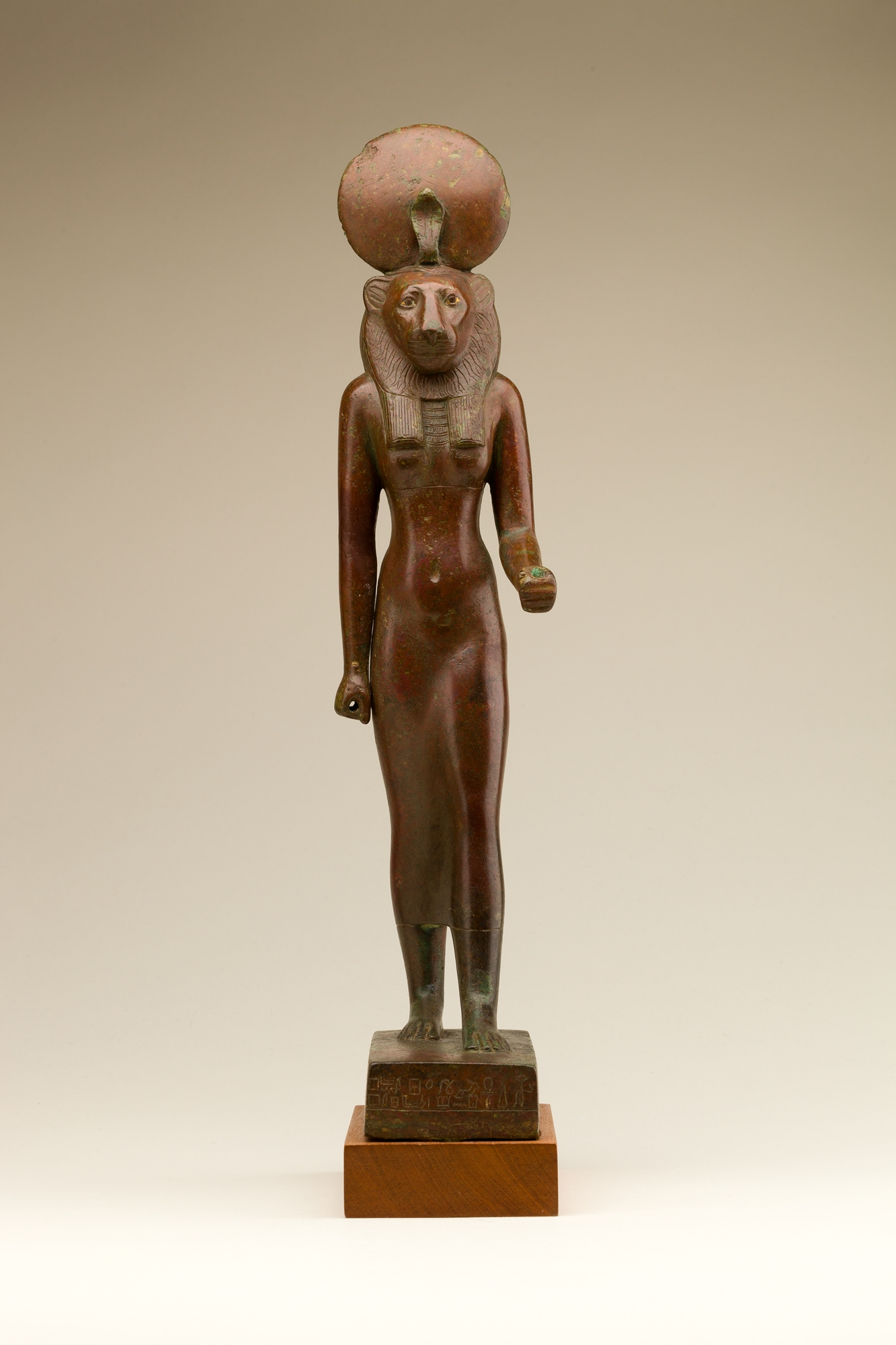
Wadjet in the form of a lioness, in the name of Akanosh son of Pediamenopet, Metropolitan Museum of Art

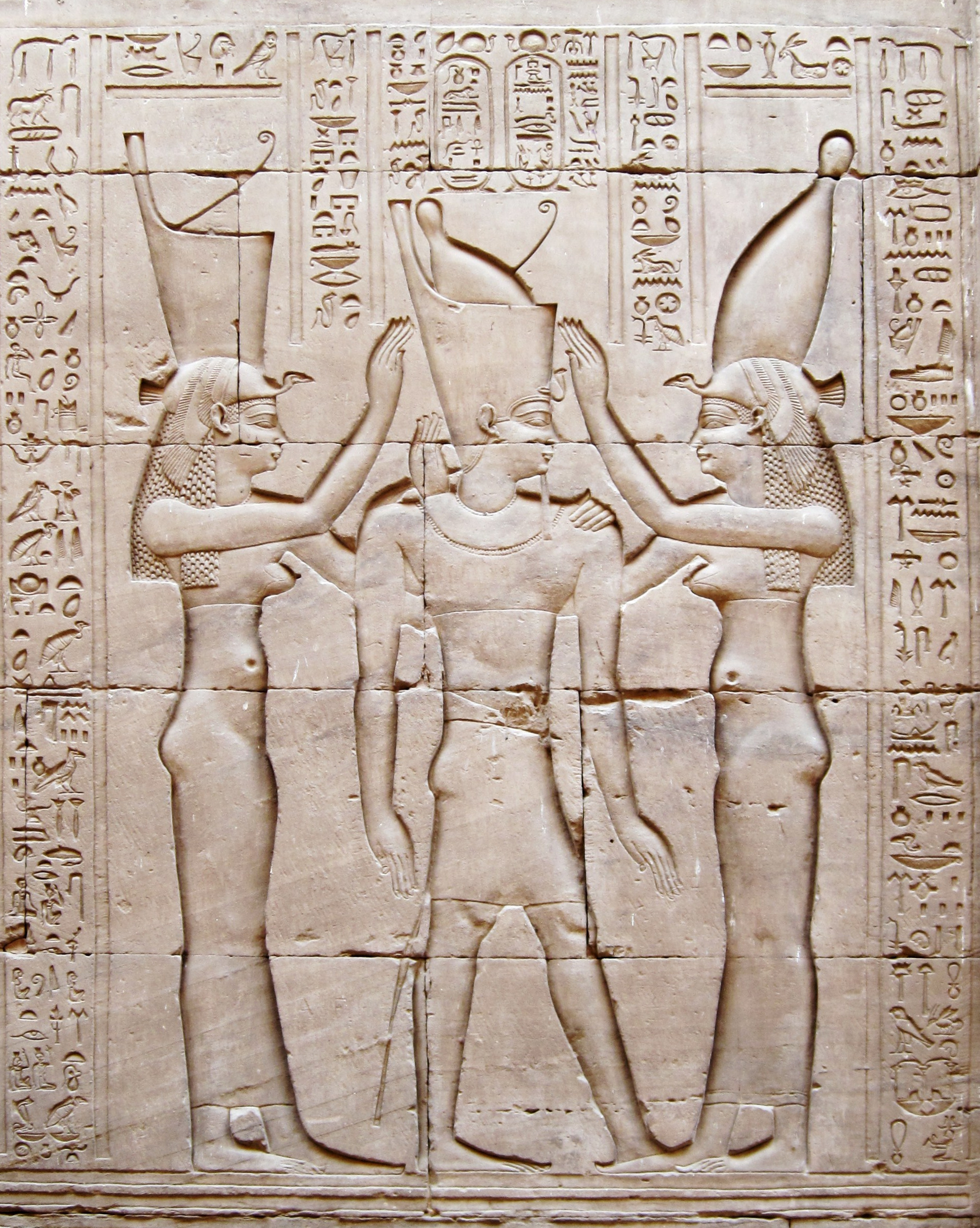
Wadjet (left) and Nekhbet (right) crowning Ptolemy VIII, Temple of Edfu

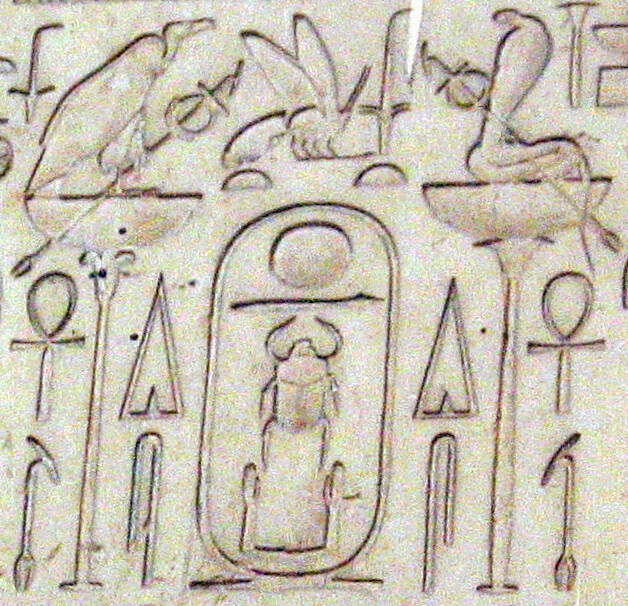
Stela depicting Wadjet (top right), and Nekhbet (top left), serving as protectors and unifiers of Egypt in to Stela of Tuthmosis I from Kom Bilal (near Deir el-Ballas). as seen in the Cairo, Egyptian Museum,

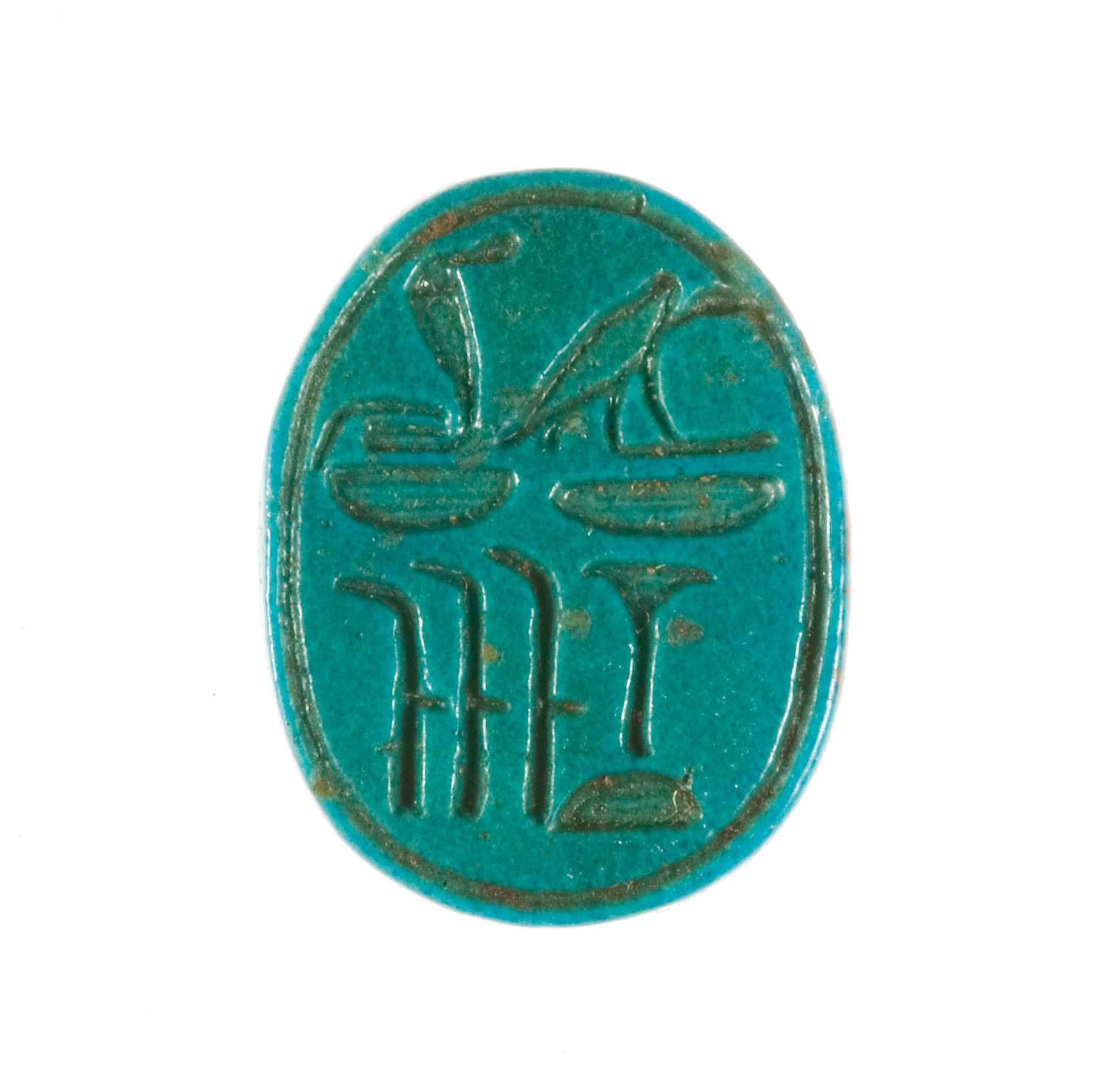
Scarab enscribed with 'The Two Ladies", Wadjet and Nekhbet protector deities of lower and upper Egypt respectively.

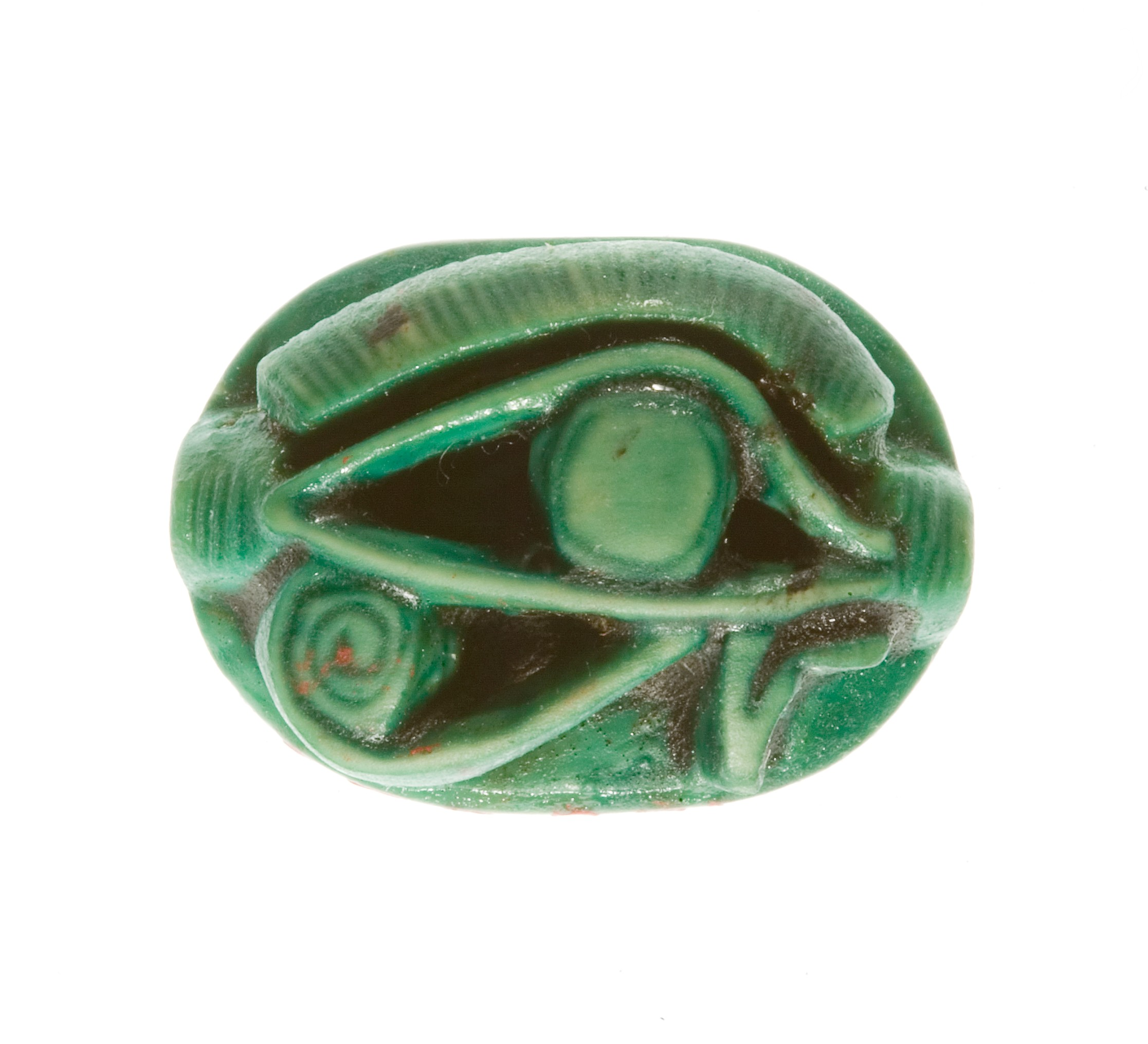
Wadjet Eye stamp seal marked with "Maatkare, Beloved of Amun".

== See also ==
- Ethnoherpetology
- Eye of Horus
- Snake goddess
- Snakes in mythology
