= Iusaaset =

Ancient Egyptian primordial deity

- Consort Of Atum, Goddess Of Creation, and Acacia Trees.
- Iusaaset, Is an Ancient Egyptian Goddess. She represents the hand of the god Atum. Which was used in the act of Masturbation to create Shu and Tefnut.
Name in hieroglyphs
D54 V1 S29 T1 D36 G1 S29 t H8 I12
- Major cult center: Heliopolis

Genealogy
- Consort: Atum
- Children: Shu and Tefnut

Iusaaset, Iusaas, or, in Greek, Saosis, is a primordial goddess in Ancient Egyptian religion, a feminine counterpart to the male creator deity Atum. Iusaaset was depicted as a woman with a scarab beetle on her head. She was worshipped in the city of I͗wnw or Iunu, Greek Heliopolis, as was Atum. Iusaaset was associated with the acacia tree and acacias stood at the sanctuary dedicated to Iusaaset at Heliopolis.

The process of creation was said to have begun when Atum masturbated, or copulated with himself, to produce the deities Shu and Tefnut, thus beginning the process of creation. The hand he used in this act was personified as a goddess, the Hand of Atum. She was equated with Hathor or Iusaaset and Nebethetepet, two other, more minor goddesses. The earliest texts to mention them seem to treat Iusaaset and Nebethetepet as two names for a single goddess, but after the time of the Middle Kingdom (c. 2000–1700 BC) they were treated as separate, although similar, deities. The name "Iusaaset" means something resembling "She who grows as she comes" and "Nebethetepet" means "Lady of the Field of Offerings', so the Egyptologist Stephen Quirke suggests that they represented two aspects of creation: Iusaaset for growth and Nebethetepet for abundance.

== Sources ==
- Vandier, Jacques. 1964-66. "Iousâas et (Hathor)-Nébet-Hétépet." Revue d’Égyptologie 16–18.
