= Eye of Ra =

Violent feminine counterpart of Ra in Ancient Egyptian mythology

The right wedjat-eye, symbolizing the Eye of Ra

The Eye of Ra can be equated with the disk of the sun, with the cobras coiled around the disk, and with the white and red crowns of Upper and Lower Egypt.

The Eye of Ra or Eye of Re, usually depicted as sun disk or right wedjat-eye (paired with the Eye of Horus, left wedjat-eye), is an entity in ancient Egyptian mythology that functions as an extension of the sun god Ra's power, equated with the disk of the sun, but it often behaves as an independent goddess, a feminine counterpart to Ra and a violent force that subdues his enemies. This goddess, also known with the theonym Wedjat, can be equated with several particular deities, including Hathor, Sekhmet, Bastet, Raet-Tawy, Menhit, Tefnut, and Mut. The eye goddess acts as mother, sister, wife, and daughter of the sun god. She is his partner in the creative cycle in which he begets the renewed form of himself that is born at dawn. The eye's violent aspect defends Ra against the agents of disorder that threaten his rule. This dangerous aspect of the eye goddess is often represented by a lioness or by the uraeus, or cobra, a symbol of protection and royal authority. The disastrous fury and rampages of the eye goddess and the efforts of the gods to appease her are a prominent motif in Egyptian mythology.

The Eye of Ra was involved in many areas of ancient Egyptian religion, including in the cults of the many goddesses who are equated with it. Its life-giving power was celebrated in temple rituals, and its dangerous aspect was invoked in the protection of the pharaoh, of sacred places, and of ordinary people and their homes.

== Origins ==
The Egyptians often referred to the sun and the moon as the "eyes" of particular gods. The right eye of Ra-Horus (merged into the god Ra-Horakhty), for instance, was equated with the sun, and his left eye equated with the moon. At times the Egyptians called the lunar eye the "Eye of Horus" and called the solar eye the "Eye of Ra"—Ra being the preeminent sun god in ancient Egyptian religion. Both eyes were represented by the wedjat symbol, a stylized human eye with the facial markings of the falcon that signified Horus. The Egyptologist Richard H. Wilkinson believes the two Eyes of Horus gradually became distinguished as the lunar Eye of Horus and the solar Eye of Ra; however, Rolf Krauss argues that no text equates the Eyes of Horus with the sun and moon until late in Egyptian history, so the Eye of Horus must have originally had some other significance.

Because many concepts in Egyptian belief are fluid, the roles of the two eyes frequently overlapped. One such area of overlap is that in myth, both Horus and Ra lose their respective eyes. Katja Goebs argues that the myths surrounding the two eyes are based around the same mytheme, or core element of a myth, and that "rather than postulating a single, original myth of one cosmic body, which was then merged with others, it might be more fruitful to think in terms of a (flexible) myth based on the structural relationship of an Object that is missing, or located far from its owner". The Pyramid Texts from the Old Kingdom (c. 2686–2181 BC), one of the earliest sources for Egyptian myth, mention both the Eye of Horus and the Eye of Ra.

== Roles ==
=== Solar ===
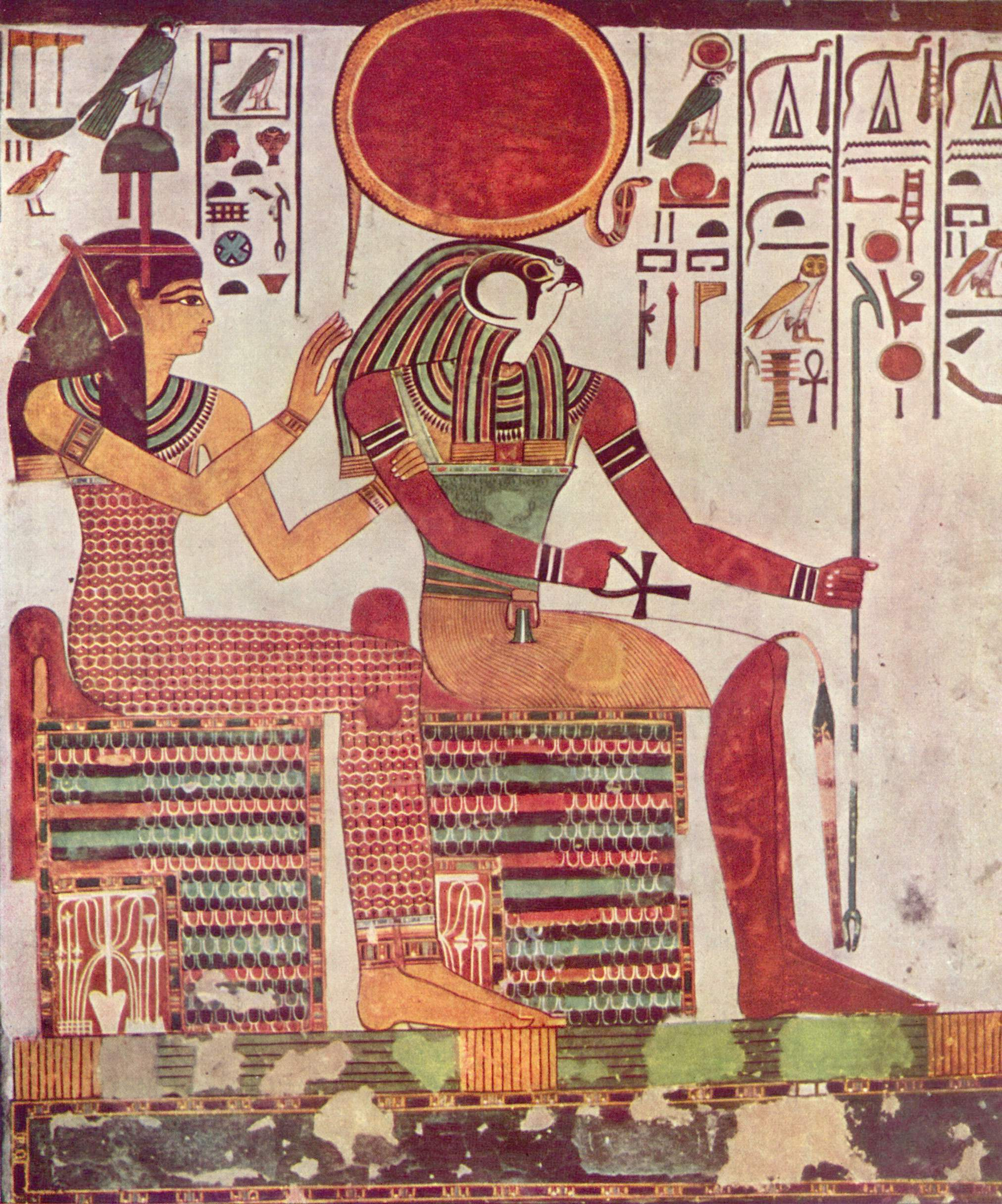
Ra adorned with the sun-disk, from the tomb of Nefertari, 13th century BC

The yellow or red disk-like sun emblem in Egyptian art represents the Eye of Ra. Because of the great importance of the sun in Egyptian religion, this emblem is one of the most common religious symbols in all of Egyptian art. Although Egyptologists usually call this emblem the "sun disk", its convex shape in Egyptian relief sculpture suggests that the Egyptians may have envisioned it as a sphere. The emblem often appears atop the heads of solar-associated deities, including Ra himself, to indicate their links with the sun. The disk could even be regarded as Ra's physical form. At other times, the sun god, in various forms, is depicted inside the disk shape, as if enclosed within it. The Egyptians often described the sun's movement across the sky as the movement of a barque carrying Ra and his entourage of other gods, and the sun disk can either be equated with this solar barque or depicted containing the barque inside it. The disk is often called Ra's "daughter" in Egyptian texts.

As the sun, the Eye of Ra is a source of heat and light, and it is associated with fire and flames. It is also equated with the red light that appears before sunrise, and with the morning star that precedes and signals the sun's arrival.

=== Procreative ===
The eyes of Egyptian deities, although they are aspects of the power of the gods who own them, can behave as independent beings in mythology, possibly because the word for "eye" in Egyptian, jrt, resembles another word meaning "do" or "act". The presence of the feminine suffix -t in jrt may explain why these independent eyes were thought of as female. The Eye of Ra, in particular, is deeply involved in the sun god's creative actions.

In Egyptian mythology, the sun's emergence from the horizon each morning is likened to Ra's birth, an event that revitalizes him and the order of the cosmos. Ra emerges from the body of a goddess who represents the sky—usually Nut. Depictions of the rising sun often show Ra as a child contained within the solar disk. In this context, the Egyptologist Lana Troy suggests, the disk may represent the womb from which he is born or the placenta that emerges with him. The Eye of Ra can also take the form of a goddess, which according to Troy is both the mother who brings Ra forth from her womb and a sister who is born alongside him like a placenta. Ra was sometimes said to enter the body of the sky goddess at sunset, impregnating her and setting the stage for his rebirth at sunrise. Consequently, the eye, as womb and mother of the child form of Ra, is also the consort of the adult Ra. The adult Ra, likewise, is the father of the eye who is born at sunrise. The eye is thus a feminine counterpart to Ra's masculine creative power, part of a broader Egyptian tendency to express creation and renewal through the metaphor of sexual reproduction. Ra gives rise to his daughter, the eye, who in turn gives rise to him, her son, in a cycle of constant regeneration.

Ra is not unique in this relationship with the eye. Other solar gods may interact in a similar way with the numerous goddesses associated with the eye. Hathor, a goddess of the sky, the sun, and fertility, is often called the Eye of Ra, and she also has a relationship with Horus, who also has solar connections, that is similar to the relationship between Ra and his eye. The eye can also act as an extension of and companion to Atum, a creator god closely associated with Ra. Sometimes this eye is called the Eye of Atum, although at other times the Eye of Ra and the Eye of Atum are treated as distinct, and Ra's eye is equated with the sun and Atum's eye with the moon.

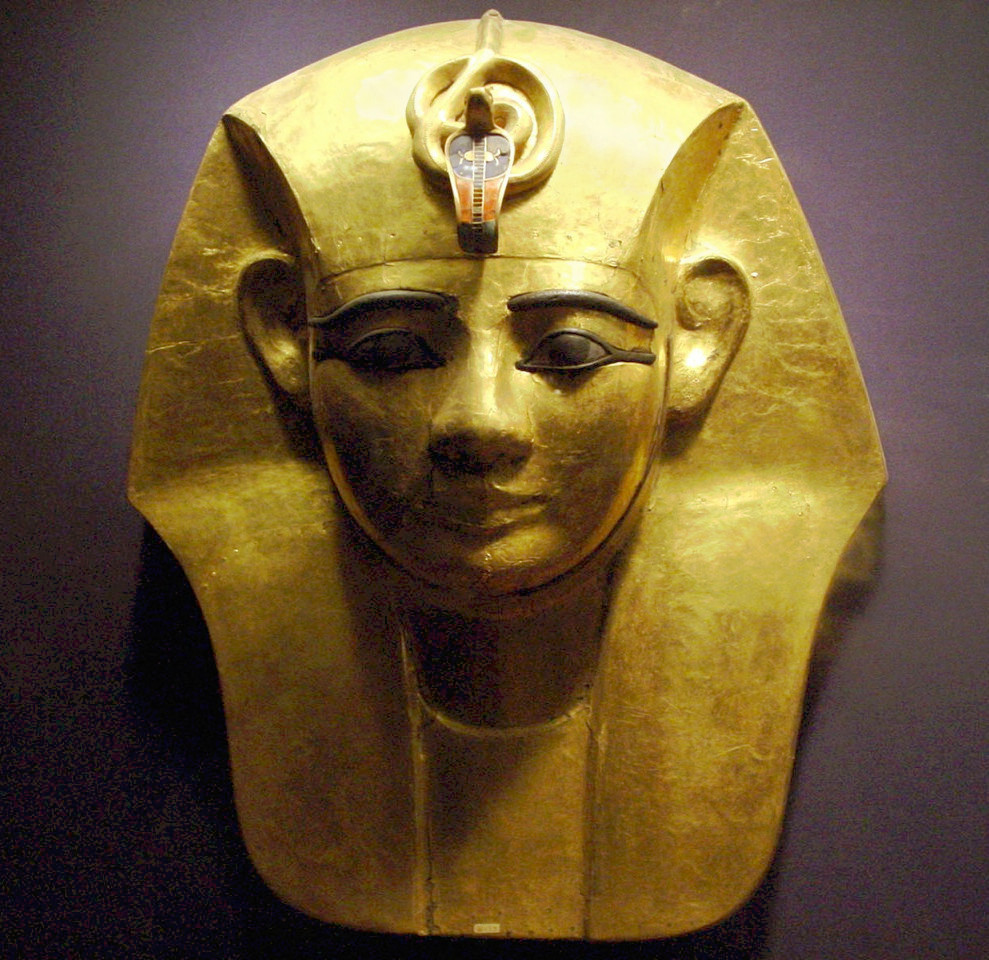
The uraeus on the royal headdress of Amenemope

A myth about the eye, known from allusions in the Coffin Texts from the Middle Kingdom (c. 2055–1650 BC) and a more complete account in the Bremner-Rhind Papyrus from the Late Period (664–332 BC), demonstrates the eye's close connection with Ra and Atum and her ability to act independently. The myth takes place before the creation of the world, when the solar creator—either Ra or Atum—is alone. Shu and Tefnut, the children of this creator god, have drifted away from him in the waters of Nu, the chaos that exists before creation in Egyptian belief, so he sends out his eye to find them. The eye returns with Shu and Tefnut but is infuriated to see that the creator has developed a new eye, which has taken her place. The creator god appeases her by giving her an exalted position on his forehead in the form of the uraeus, the emblematic cobra that appears frequently in Egyptian art, particularly on royal crowns. The equation of the eye with the uraeus and the crown underlines the eye's role as a companion to Ra and to the pharaoh, with whom Ra is linked. Upon the return of Shu and Tefnut, the creator god is said to have shed tears, although whether they are prompted by happiness at his children's return or distress at the eye's anger is unclear. These tears give rise to the first humans. In a variant of the story, it is the eye that weeps instead, so the eye is the progenitor of humankind.

The tears of the Eye of Ra are part of a more general connection between the eye and moisture. In addition to representing the morning star, the eye can also be equated with the star Sothis (Sirius). Every summer, at the start of the Egyptian year, Sothis's heliacal rising, in which the star rose above the horizon just before the sun itself, heralded the start of the Nile inundation, which watered and fertilized Egypt's farmland. Therefore, the Eye of Ra precedes and represents the floodwaters that restore fertility to all of Egypt.

=== Aggressive and protective ===
The Eye of Ra also represents the destructive aspect of Ra's power: the heat of the sun, which in Egypt can be so harsh that the Egyptians sometimes likened it to arrows shot by a god to destroy evildoers. The uraeus is a logical symbol for this dangerous power. In art, the sun disk image often incorporates one or two uraei coiled around it. The solar uraeus represents the eye as a dangerous force that encircles the sun god and guards against his enemies, spitting flames like venom. Four uraei are sometimes said to surround Ra's barque. Collectively called "Hathor of the Four Faces", they represent the eye's vigilance in all directions.

Ra's enemies are the forces of chaos, which threaten maat, the cosmic order that he creates. They include both humans who spread disorder and cosmic powers like Apep, the embodiment of chaos, whom Ra and the gods who accompany him in his barque are said to combat every night. The malevolent gaze of Apep's own eye is a potent weapon against Ra, and Ra's eye is one of the few powers that can counteract it. Some unclear passages in the Coffin Texts suggest that Apep was thought capable of injuring or stealing the Eye of Ra from its master during the combat. In other texts, the eye's fiery breath assists in Apep's destruction. This apotropaic function of the Eye of Ra is another point of overlap with the Eye of Horus, which was similarly believed to ward off evil.

The eye's aggression may even extend to deities who, unlike Apep, are not regarded as evil. Evidence in early funerary texts suggests that at dawn, Ra was believed to swallow the multitude of other gods, who in this instance are equated with the stars, which vanish at sunrise and reappear at sunset. In doing so, he absorbs the gods' power, thereby renewing his own vitality, before spitting them out again at nightfall. The solar eye is said to assist in this effort, slaughtering the gods for Ra to eat. The red light of dawn therefore signifies the blood produced by this slaughter.

In the myth called the Destruction of Mankind, related in the Book of the Heavenly Cow from the New Kingdom (c. 1550–1070 BC), Ra uses the eye as a weapon against humans who have rebelled against his authority. He sends the eye—Hathor, in her aggressive manifestation as the lioness goddess Sekhmet—to massacre them. She does so, but after the first day of her rampage, Ra decides to prevent her from killing all humanity. He orders that beer be dyed red and poured out over the land. The eye goddess drinks the beer, mistaking it for blood, and in her inebriated state returns to Ra without noticing her intended victims. Through her drunkenness she has been returned to a harmless form. Nadine Guilhou suggests that the eye's rampage alludes to the heat and widespread disease of the Egyptian summer, and in particular to the epagomenal days before the new year, which were regarded as unlucky. The red beer might then refer to the red silt that accompanied the subsequent Nile flood, which was believed to end the period of misfortune.

The solar eye's volatile nature can make her difficult even for her master to control. In the myth of the "Distant Goddess", a motif with several variants that may be descended from the story in the Book of the Heavenly Cow, the eye goddess becomes upset with Ra and runs away from him. In some versions the provocation for her anger seems to be her replacement with a new eye after the search for Shu and Tefnut, but in others her rebellion seems to take place after the world is fully formed. With the solar eye gone, Ra is vulnerable to his enemies and bereft of a large part of his power. The eye's absence and Ra's weakened state may be a mythological reference to solar eclipses.

Meanwhile, the eye wanders in a distant land—Nubia, Libya, or Punt. She takes the form of a wild feline, as dangerous and uncontrolled as the forces of chaos that she is meant to subdue. To restore order, one of the gods goes out to retrieve her. In one version, known from scattered allusions, the warrior god Anhur searches for the eye, which takes the form of the goddess Mehit, using his skills as a hunter. In other accounts, it is Shu who searches for Tefnut, who in this case represents the eye rather than an independent deity. Thoth, who often serves as a messenger and conciliator in the Egyptian pantheon, can also seek the wandering goddess. His role in retrieving the Eye of Ra parallels his role in the Osiris myth, in which he heals or returns Horus's lost eye. In a Late Period papyrus dubbed "The Myth of the Eye of the Sun", Thoth persuades the Eye of Ra to return through a combination of lectures, enticement, and entertaining stories. His efforts are not uniformly successful; at one point, the goddess is so enraged by Thoth's words that she transforms from a relatively benign cat into a fire-breathing lioness, making Thoth jump.

When the goddess is at last placated, the retrieving god escorts her back to Egypt. Her return marks the beginning of the inundation and the new year. Joachim Friedrich Quack points out that when Sirius reappears in the sky it first appears reddish before turning blue-white, and he suggests the Egyptians connected this change in color with the pacification of the eye goddess. The pacified eye deity is once more a procreative consort for the sun god, or, in some versions of the story, for the god who brings her back. Mehit becomes the consort of Anhur, Tefnut is paired with Shu, and Thoth's spouse is sometimes Nehemtawy, a minor goddess associated with this pacified form of the eye. In many cases, the eye goddess and her consort then produce a divine child who becomes the new sun god. The goddess' transformation from hostile to peaceful is a key step in the renewal of the sun god and the kingship that he represents.

The dual nature of the eye goddess shows, as Graves-Brown puts it, that "the Egyptians saw a double nature to the feminine, which encompassed both extreme passions of fury and love." This same view of femininity is found in texts describing human women, such as the Instruction of Ankhsheshonq, which says a man's wife is like a cat when he can keep her happy and like a lioness when he cannot.

== Manifestations ==
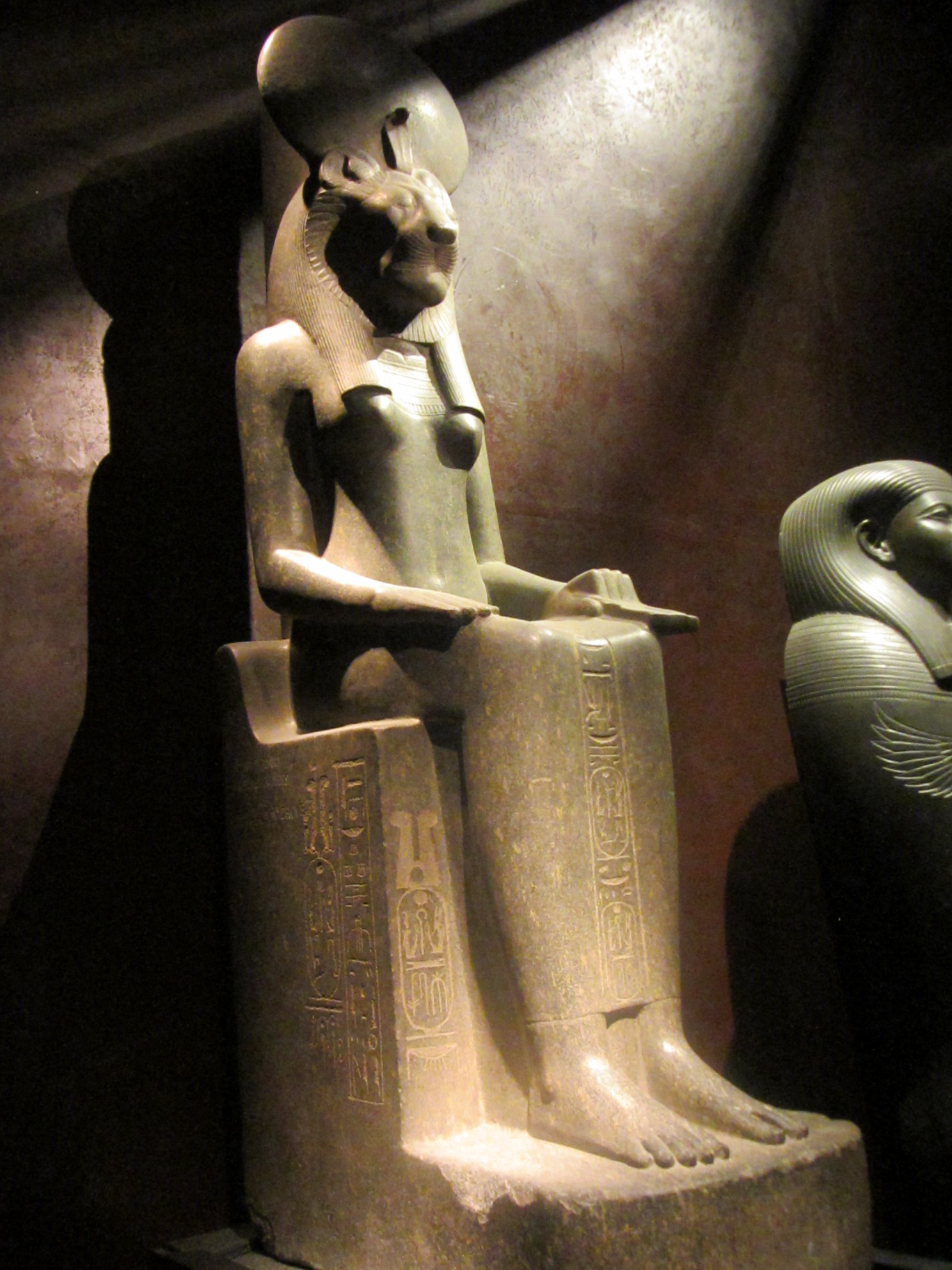
Sekhmet as a woman with the head of a lioness, wearing the sun disk and uraeus

The characteristics of the Eye of Ra were an important part of the Egyptian conception of female divinity in general, and the eye was equated with many goddesses, ranging from very prominent deities like Hathor to obscure ones like Mestjet, a lion goddess who appears in only one known inscription.

The Egyptians associated many gods who took felid form with the sun, and many lioness deities, like Sekhmet, Menhit, and Tefnut, were equated with the eye. Bastet was depicted as both a domestic cat and a lioness, and with these two forms she could represent both the peaceful and violent aspects of the eye. Yet another goddess of the solar eye was Mut, the consort of the god Amun, who was associated with Ra. Mut was first called the Eye of Ra in the late New Kingdom, and the aspects of her character that were related to the eye grew increasingly prominent over time. Mut, too, could appear in both leonine and cat form.

Likewise, cobra goddesses often represented the Eye of Ra. Among them was Wadjet, a tutelary deity of Lower Egypt who was closely associated with royal crowns and the protection of the king. Other cobra goddesses associated with the eye include the fertility deity Renenutet, the magician goddess Weret-hekau, and Meretseger, the divine protector of the burial grounds near the city of Thebes.

The deities associated with the eye were not restricted to feline and serpent forms. Hathor's usual animal form is a cow, as is that of the closely linked eye goddess Mehet-Weret. Nekhbet, a vulture goddess, was closely connected with Wadjet, the eye, and the crowns of Egypt. Many eye goddesses appear mainly in human form, including Neith, a sometimes warlike deity sometimes said to be the mother of the sun god, and Satet and Anuket, who were linked with the Nile cataracts and the inundation. Other such goddesses include Sothis, the deified form of the star of the same name, and Maat, the personification of cosmic order, who was connected with the eye because she was said to be the daughter of Ra. Even Isis, who is usually the companion of Osiris rather than Ra, or Astarte, a deity of fertility and warfare who was imported from Canaan rather than native to Egypt, could be equated with the solar eye.

Frequently, two eye-related goddesses appear together, representing different aspects of the eye. The juxtaposed deities often stand for the procreative and aggressive sides of the eye's character, as Hathor and Sekhmet sometimes do. Wadjet and Nekhbet can stand for Lower and Upper Egypt, respectively, along with the Red Crown and White Crown that represent the two lands. Similarly, Mut, whose main cult center was in Thebes, sometimes served as an Upper Egyptian counterpart of Sekhmet, who was worshipped in Memphis in Lower Egypt.

These goddesses and their iconographies frequently mingled. Many combinations such as Hathor-Tefnut, Mut-Sekhmet, and Bastet-Sothis appear in Egyptian texts. Wadjet could sometimes be depicted with a lion head rather than that of a cobra, Nekhbet could take on cobra form as a counterpart of Wadjet, and a great many of these goddesses wore the sun disk on their heads, sometimes with the addition of a uraeus or the cow horns from Hathor's typical headdress. Beginning in the Middle Kingdom, the hieroglyph for a uraeus could be used as a logogram or determinative for the word "goddess" in any context, because virtually any goddess could be linked with the eye's complex set of attributes.

== Worship ==
The Eye of Ra was invoked in many areas of Egyptian religion, and its mythology was incorporated into the worship of many of the goddesses identified with it.

The eye's flight from and return to Egypt was a common feature of temple ritual in the Ptolemaic and Roman periods (305 BC – AD 390), when the new year and the Nile flood that came along with it were celebrated as the return of the eye after her wanderings in foreign lands. The Egyptians built shrines along the river containing images of animals and dwarfs rejoicing at the goddess' arrival. Scholars do not know how well developed the myth and the corresponding rituals were in earlier times. One of the oldest examples is Mut's return to her home temple in Thebes, which was celebrated there annually as early as the New Kingdom. At the temple of Montu at Medamud, in a festival that may date back to the late Middle Kingdom, it was Montu's consort Raet-Tawy who was equated with Hathor and the eye of Ra. The return of this eye goddess, in fertile, moisture-bearing form, set the stage for her subsequent marriage to Montu and the birth of their mythological child, a form of Horus. The temple's new year festival celebrated her homecoming with drinking and dancing, paralleling the goddess' inebriated state after her pacification. In other cities, two goddesses were worshipped as the belligerent and peaceful forms of the eye, as with Ayet and Nehemtawy at Herakleopolis or Satet and Anuket at Aswan.

In another temple ritual, the pharaoh played a ceremonial game in honor of the eye goddesses Hathor, Sekhmet, or Tefnut, in which he struck a ball symbolizing the Eye of Apep with a club made from a type of wood that was said to have sprung from the Eye of Ra. The ritual represents the battle of Ra's eye with its greatest foe.

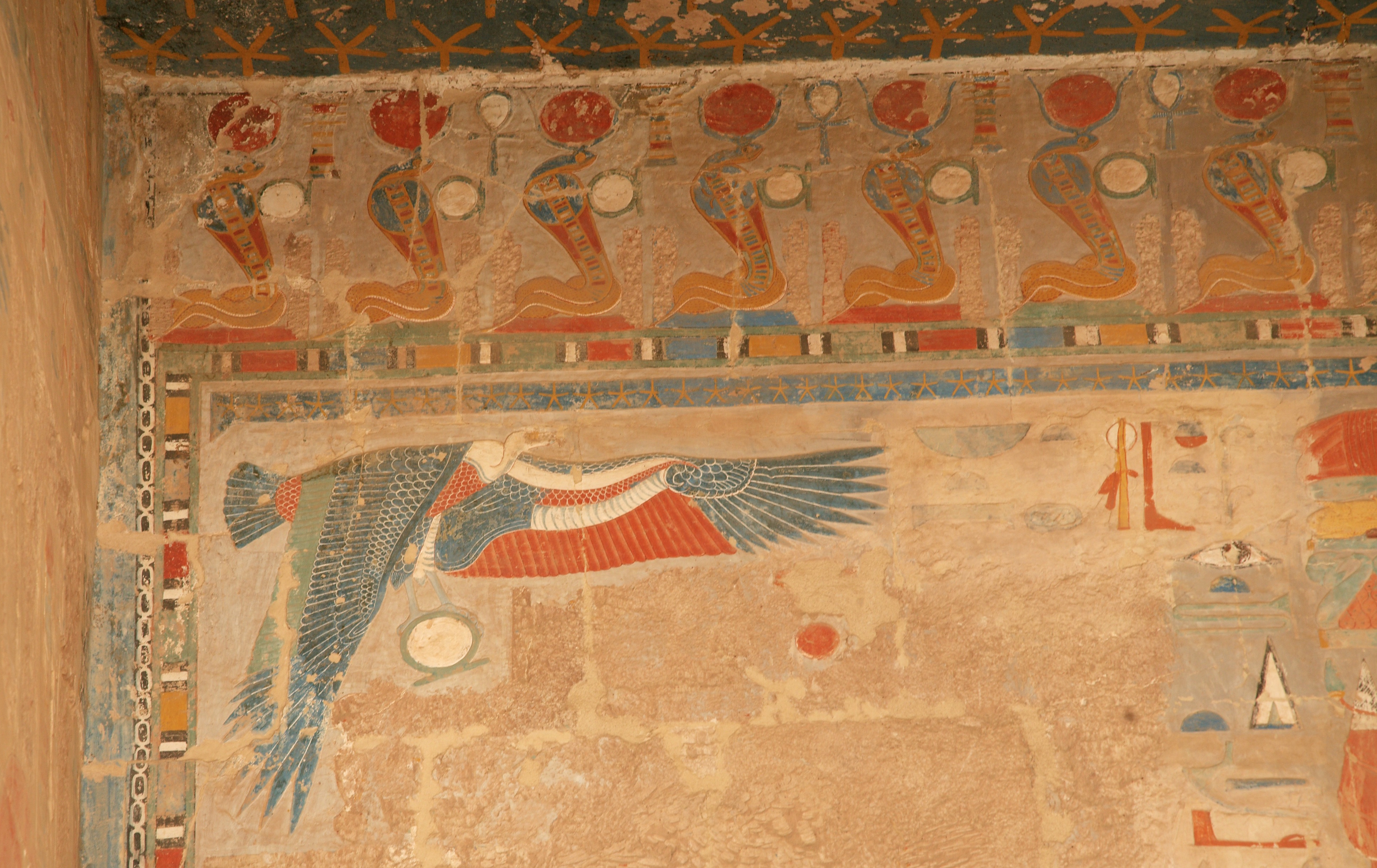
Frieze of uraei bearing sun disks at the top of a wall in the Mortuary Temple of Hatshepsut

The concept of the solar eye as mother, consort, and daughter of a god was incorporated into royal ideology. Pharaohs took on the role of Ra, and their consorts were associated with the eye and the goddesses equated with it. The sun disks and uraei that were incorporated into queens' headdresses during the New Kingdom reflect this mythological tie. The priestesses who acted as ceremonial "wives" of particular gods during the Third Intermediate Period (c. 1059–653 BC), such as the God's Wife of Amun, had a similar relationship with the gods they served. Amenhotep III even dedicated a temple at Sedeinga in Nubia to his wife, Tiye, as a manifestation of the Eye of Ra, paralleling the temple to Amenhotep himself at nearby Soleb.

The violent form of the eye was also invoked in religious ritual and symbolism as an agent of protection. The uraeus on royal and divine headdresses alludes to the role of the eye goddesses as protectors of gods and kings. For similar reasons, uraei appear in rows atop shrines and other structures, surrounding and symbolically guarding them against hostile powers. Many temple rituals called upon eye goddesses to defend the temple precinct or the resident deity. Often, the texts of such rituals specifically mention a set of four defensive uraei. These uraei are sometimes identified with various combinations of goddesses associated with the eye, but they can also be seen as manifestations of "Hathor of the Four Faces", whose protection of the solar barque is extended in these rituals to specific places on earth.

The Eye of Ra could also be invoked to defend ordinary people. Some apotropaic amulets in the shape of the Eye of Horus bear the figure of a goddess on one side. These amulets are most likely an allusion to the connection between the Eye of Horus and the Eye of Ra, invoking their power for personal protection. In addition, certain magical spells from the New Kingdom involve the placement of clay model uraei around a house or a room, invoking the protection of the solar uraeus as in the temple rituals. These uraei are intended to ward off evil spirits and the nightmares that they were believed to cause, or other enemies of the house's occupant. The spell says the models have "fire in their mouths". Models like those in the spells have been found in the remains of ancient Egyptian towns, and they include bowls in front of their mouths where fuel could be burnt, although the known examples do not show signs of burning. Whether literal or metaphorical, the fire in the cobras' mouths, like the flames spat by the Eye of Ra, was meant to dispel the nocturnal darkness and burn the dangerous beings that move within it.

The eye's importance extends to the afterlife as well. Egyptian funerary texts associate deceased souls with Ra in his nightly travels through the Duat, the realm of the dead, and with his rebirth at dawn. In these texts the eye and its various manifestations often appear, protecting and giving birth to the deceased as they do for Ra. A spell in the Coffin Texts states that Bastet, as the eye, illuminates the Duat like a torch, allowing the deceased to pass safely through its depths.
