= Ennead =

Group of nine deities in Egyptian mythology worshipped at Heliopolis

- Members: Atum, Shu, Tefnut, Geb, Nut, Osiris, Isis, Set, Nephthys
Name in hieroglyphs
Z2 Z2 Z2 pzD t nTrw
psḏt
(Other spellings)
(Names of individual members)

Equivalents
- Canaanite: El's Divine Council

The Ennead or Great Ennead was a group of nine deities in Egyptian mythology worshipped at Heliopolis: the sun god Atum; his children Shu and Tefnut; their children Geb and Nut; and their children Osiris, Isis, Set, and Nephthys. The Ennead sometimes includes Horus the Elder; an ancient form of the falcon god, not the son of Osiris and Isis.

== Status within ancient Egypt ==
The Great Ennead was only one of several such groupings of nine deities in ancient Egypt. Claims to preeminence made by its Heliopolitan priests were not respected throughout Egypt, as each nome typically had its own local deities, whose priests insisted stood above all others; even in the nearby city of Memphis, which along with Heliopolis is contained within the limits of modern Cairo, the priests of Ptah celebrated him as singularly superior to the Nine — In addition to Memphis having its own creation myth, the contemporaneous city of Hermopolis had another creation story, the Ogdoad, that accounted for the physical creation of the universe by eight (different) primordial gods.

== Name in Egyptian, Greek, and Latin ==
The English name ennead is a borrowing via Latin of the Greek name enneás (ἐννεάς), meaning "the nine". The term was a calque of the Egyptian name, written psḏt and also meaning "the Nine". Its original pronunciation is uncertain, since hieroglyphs do not record vowels, but may have been /piˈsiːcʼat/ in Old Egyptian, /piˈsiːtʼaʔ/ in Middle Egyptian, and /pəˈsiːtʼə/ in Late Egyptian. Egyptologists conventionally transcribe it as Pesedjet.

== History ==
The ancient Egyptians created several enneads as their unification under Dynasty I brought numerous local cults into contact with one another. The ancient Egyptian mythology often had many different explanations for the same phenomenon. This concept is especially unique because no single story was more accurate than another, but rather the truth was a mix of them all. The Pyramid Texts of Dynasties V and VI mention the "Great Ennead", the "Lesser Ennead", the "Dual Ennead", and the "Seven Enneads". Some pharaohs established enneads that incorporated themselves as gods. The most notable case is Seti I of Dynasty XIX, whose mortuary temple at Redesiyah celebrated an ennead of six major gods and three deified forms of himself. The ennead mentioned in the Egyptian calendar of lucky and unlucky days, may reference the Pleiades.

The most important was the "Great" or "Heliopolitan Ennead" of Awanu (Ancient Egyptian: I͗wnw), known under the Greeks and Romans as Heliopolis. It celebrated the family of the sun god Atum (sometimes referred to as Atum-re) and thrived from the Old Kingdom to the Ptolemaic period.

Its development remains uncertain, although it appears to have first appeared when Ra's cult – supreme under Dynasty V – declined in importance under Dynasty VI. Egyptologists have traditionally theorized that the Heliopolitan priesthood established it to establish the preeminence of Atum over the others, incorporating some major gods in lesser positions and omitting others entirely. The most prominent of such deities was Osiris, god of vegetation and the afterlife, who was incorporated into the ennead as Atum's great-grandson. However, in the 20th century, some Egyptologists question the whole scenario. After the Great Ennead was well established, the cult of Ra – identified with Atum – recovered much of its importance until superseded by the cult of Horus. The two were then combined as Ra-Horus of the Horizons.

== Mythology ==
According to the creation story of the Heliopolitan priests, the world originally consisted of the primordial waters of precreation personified as Nun. From it arose a mound on the First Occasion. Upon the mound sat the self-begotten god Atum, who was equated with the sun god Ra. Atum evolved from Nun through self-creation. Atum either spat or masturbated, producing air personified as Shu and moisture personified as Tefnut. The siblings Shu and Tefnut mated to produce the earth personified as Geb and the nighttime sky personified as Nut.

Geb and Nut were the parents of Osiris and Isis and of Set and Nephthys, who became respective couples in turn. Osiris and Isis represent fertility and order, while Set and Nephthys represent chaos to balance out Osiris and Isis. Horus, the son of Osiris and Isis, is often included in this creation tradition. Due to the duality of Ancient Egyptian myths, this is only one of many creation stories. The Egyptians believed no specific myth was more correct than the other, rather that some combination of these myths was correct. This creation story, the Heliopolitan tradition, is one of physiological creation. The other major creation traditions are the Memphite Theology and Hermopolitian Ogdoad creation myth.

== Family tree ==
Atum
Shu | Tefnut
Geb | Nut
Osiris | Isis | Set | Nephthys

== Hieroglyphs ==
=== Variant hieroglyphs for the Ennead ===
| N6 d nTrw G7 Z3 | pzD t Z2 nTr | N6 t nTrw A40 Z3 | N6 t y nTrw G7 Z3 |
| pzD t nTr Z3 | N6 t nTrw | pzD t nTrw A40 Z3 | pzD t A40 Z2 |
| pzD t nTrw G7 | pzD t nTrw | pzD mDAt nTrw | N10 mDAt nTrw G7 Z93 |
| nTrw nTrw nTrw | pzD mDAt nTrw nTrw nTrw | pzD Z93 Z93 Z93 nTrw nTrw nTrw | F37B t Z2 Z2 Z2 nTrw |

A dual Ennead (Psḏty) was written

nTrw nTrw nTrw nTrw nTrw nTrw

=== Hieroglyphs of individual members ===
| t tm A40Atum | S Sw w A40Shu | t f n t I13Tefnut |
| gb b A40Geb | nw t ptNut | st ir A40Osiris |
| st t H8 B1Isis | s t S E20Set | O9 t H8Nephthys |

== In popular culture ==
In JoJo's Bizarre Adventure: Stardust Crusaders, four of Dio Brando's minions have Stands named after the Ennead: Geb, Sethan, Osiris and Atum.

Most of the Ennead are portrayed in Gods of Egypt (2016 movie); the main focus of the movie is the conflict between the protagonist god Horus versus the antagonist god Set.

In the first episode of the 2022 Marvel Cinematic Universe television miniseries Moon Knight, Steven Grant points out a problem with some of the museum's marketing material that seems to refer to the Ennead as a pantheon consisting of seven, rather than nine, gods. Yet in episode 3 they name Hathor as part of the Ennead, pointing out a deviation with the series' interpretation of the mythology.

The Infernal Relics expansion to the cooperative, superhero card-game Sentinels of the Multiverse introduced a group of supervillains collectively called the Ennead. Each of its members wield an ancient artifact that grant them the powers and appearance of a member of the mythological Ennead; in the game's universe, most of the ancient Egyptian religion originated from stories about the original wielders of these artifacts.

== Bibliography ==
- Vygus, Mark (April 2015). "Middle Egyptian Dictionary" (PDF). Pyramid Texts Online.
