= Nebethetepet =

Ancient Egyptian deity

- The Personification Of The Hand Of Atum
- Nebethetepet, is often depicted as a Female Goddess wearing a headdress similar, or identical to Hathor.
Name in hieroglyphs
nb t Htp t p t H8 I12
- Major cult center: Heliopolis

Genealogy
- Spouse: Atum
- Children: Shu and Tefnut

Nebethetepet (nb.t-ḥtp.t) is an ancient Egyptian goddess. Her name means "Lady of the Offerings" or "Satisfied Lady". She was worshipped in Heliopolis as a female counterpart of Atum. She personified Atum's hand, the female principle of creation, and could also be a title for Hathor, but aside from that had little significance.
