= Atum =

Ancient Egyptian creator deity

- Atum with Double Crown, a was-scepter to show his power, and an ankh to symbolize his ability to grant life
Name in hieroglyphs
t U15 A40
- Major cult center: Heliopolis

Genealogy
- Consort: Iusaaset or Nebethetepet
- Children: Shu and Tefnut

Atum (/ɑ.tum/, Egyptian: jtm(w) or tm(w), reconstructed [jaˈtaːmuw]; Coptic ⲁⲧⲟⲩⲙ Atoum), sometimes rendered as Atem, Temu, or Tem, is the primordial God in Egyptian mythology from whom all else arose. He created himself and is the father of Shu and Tefnut, the divine couple, who are the ancestors of the other Egyptian deities. Atum is also closely associated with the evening sun. As a primordial god and as the evening sun, Atum has chthonic and underworld connections. Atum was relevant to the ancient Egyptians throughout most of Egypt's history. He is believed to have been present in ideology as early as predynastic times, becoming even more prevalent during the Old Kingdom and continuing to be worshiped through the Middle and New Kingdom, though he becomes overshadowed by Ra around this time.

== Name ==
Atum's name is thought to be derived from the verb tm which means 'to complete' or 'to finish'. Thus, he has been interpreted as being the "complete one" and also the finisher of the world, which he returns to watery chaos at the end of the creative cycle. As creator, he was seen as the progenitor of the world, the deities and universe having received his vital force or ka.

== Origins ==
A representation of the Memphite idea of creation, stating Ptah as the original creator and father to Atum-Ra

Ptah-Tatenen
Atum-Ra
Shu	Tefnut
Geb	Nut
Osiris	Isis	Set	Nephthys
Horus

Atum is one of the most important and frequently mentioned deities from earliest times, as evidenced by his prominence in the Pyramid Texts, where he is sometimes syncretized with Ra to form Ra-Atum, and is portrayed as both a creator and father to the king throughout the collection of spells. Several writings contradict how Atum was brought into existence. According to the Heliopolitan view, Atum originally existed in his egg within the primeval waters, being born during the primordial flood, becoming the source of everything that was created after him. The Memphites (priests of Memphis), on the other hand, believed that Ptah created Atum in a more intellectual way, using his speech and thought, as told on the Shabaka Stone.

== Role ==
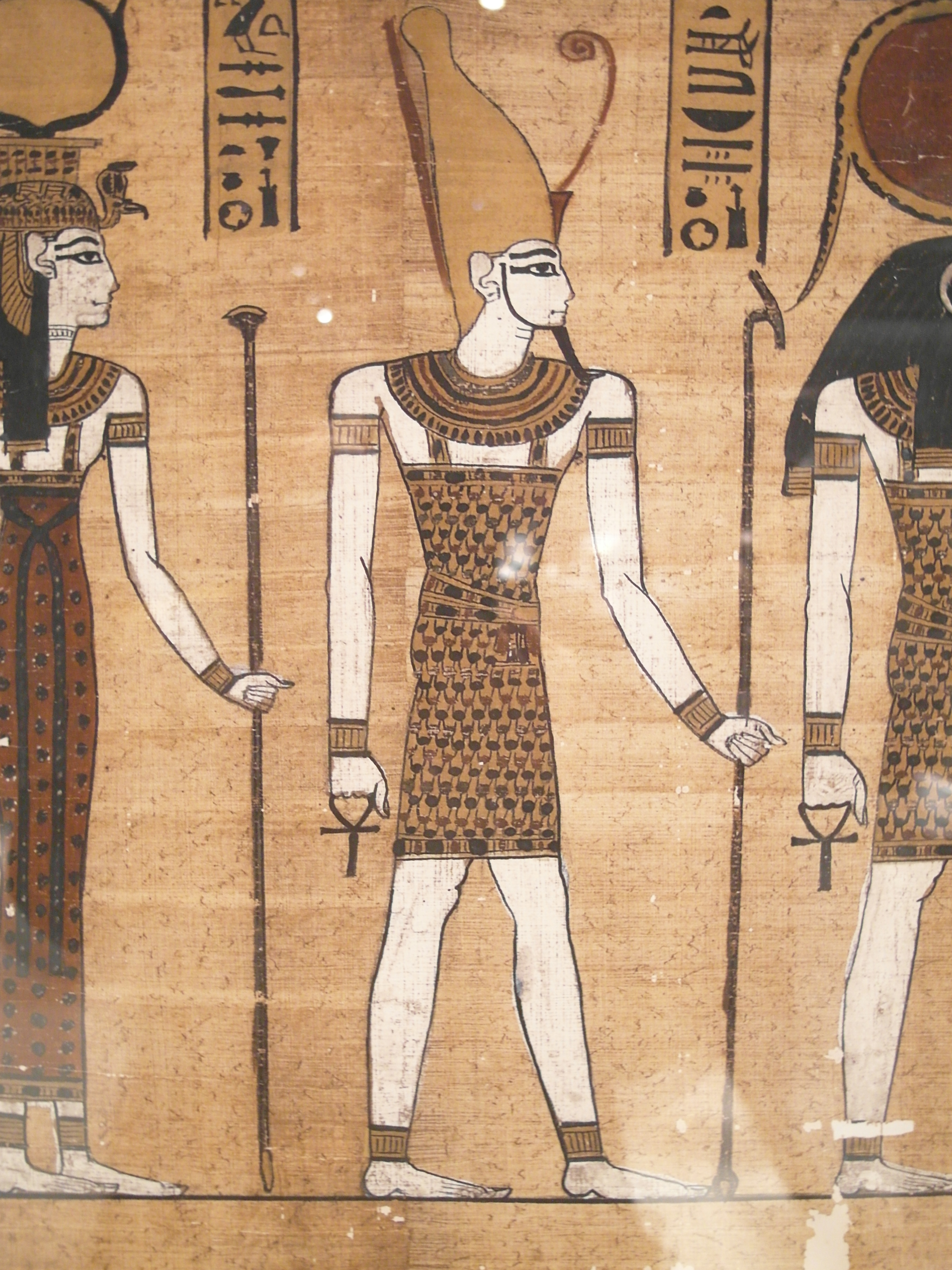
Atum depicted between Ra-Horakhty and Hathor from the Harris Papyrus, 20th Dynasty (c. 1184–1153 BC)

In the Heliopolitan Cosmogony, Atum was considered to be the first god, having created himself, sitting on a mound (benben) (or identified with the mound itself), and rose from the primordial waters (Nu). Early myths state that Atum created the god Shu and goddess Tefnut by spitting them out of his mouth. One text debates that Atum did not create Shu and Tefnut by spitting them out of his mouth by means of saliva and semen, but rather by Atum's lips. Another writing describes Shu and Tefnut being birthed by Atum's hand. That same writing states that Atum's hand is the title of the god's wife based on her Heliopolitan beginning. Other myths state Atum created by masturbation, with the hand he used in this act that may be interpreted as the female principle inherent within him because the word for hand in Egyptian is feminine (ḏr.t) and identified with goddesses such as Hathor or Iusaaset. Yet other interpretations state that he made union with his shadow.

In the Old Kingdom, the Egyptians believed that Atum lifted the dead king's soul from his pyramid to the starry heavens. He was also a solar deity, associated with the primary sun god Ra. Atum was linked specifically with the evening sun, while Ra or the closely linked god Khepri were connected with the sun at morning and midday.

In the Coffin Texts, Atum has a vital conversation with Osiris in which he describes the end of the universe as a time in which everything will cease to exist with the exception of the elements of the primordial waters, stating that after millions of years he and Osiris would be the only ones to survive the end of time as serpents. He claims that he will destroy everything he created in the beginning of existence and bring it back to Nu, the primeval waters, thus describing the belief that the gods and goddesses would one day cease to exist outside of the primeval waters.

In the Book of the Dead, which was still current in the Graeco-Roman period, the sun god Atum is said to have ascended from chaos-waters with the appearance of a snake, the animal renewing itself every morning.

Atum is the god of pre-existence and post-existence. In the binary solar cycle, the serpentine Atum is contrasted with the scarab-headed god Khepri—the young sun god, whose name is derived from the Egyptian ḫpr "to come into existence". Khepri-Atum encompassed sunrise and sunset, thus reflecting the entire cycle of morning and evening.

== Relationship to other gods ==
Atum was a self-created deity, the first being to emerge from the darkness and endless watery abyss that existed before creation. A product of the energy and matter contained in this chaos, he created his children—the first deities, out of loneliness. He produced from his own sneeze, or in some accounts, semen, Shu, the god of air, and Tefnut, the goddess of moisture. The brother and sister, curious about the primeval waters that surrounded them, went to explore the waters and disappeared into the darkness. Unable to bear his loss, Atum sent a fiery messenger, the Eye of Ra, to find his children. The tears of joy he shed upon their return were the first human beings.

== Iconography ==
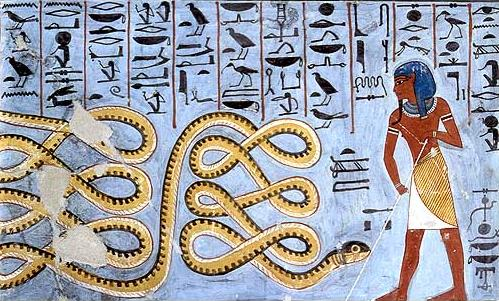
Atum on right side facing Apep with a spear, tomb of Ramesses I, 19th Dynasty (c. 1292–1290 BC)

Atum is usually depicted in anthropomorphic form, wearing either the divine Tripartite wig or the dual white and red crown of Upper and Lower Egypt, known as the Double Crown, reinforcing his connection with kingship. In the Netherworld Books, he is sometimes depicted as an old man leaning on a stick, a reference to his role as the aging evening sun. Sometimes he is also shown as a serpent, the form he returns to at the end of the creative cycle, and also occasionally as a mongoose, lion, bull, lizard, or ape. When he is represented as a solar deity, he can also be depicted as a scarab and when in reference to his primeval origins he is also seen depicted as the primeval mound. In the Greco-Roman period, he was sometimes shown as a standing ape holding a bow and arrow.

== Worship ==
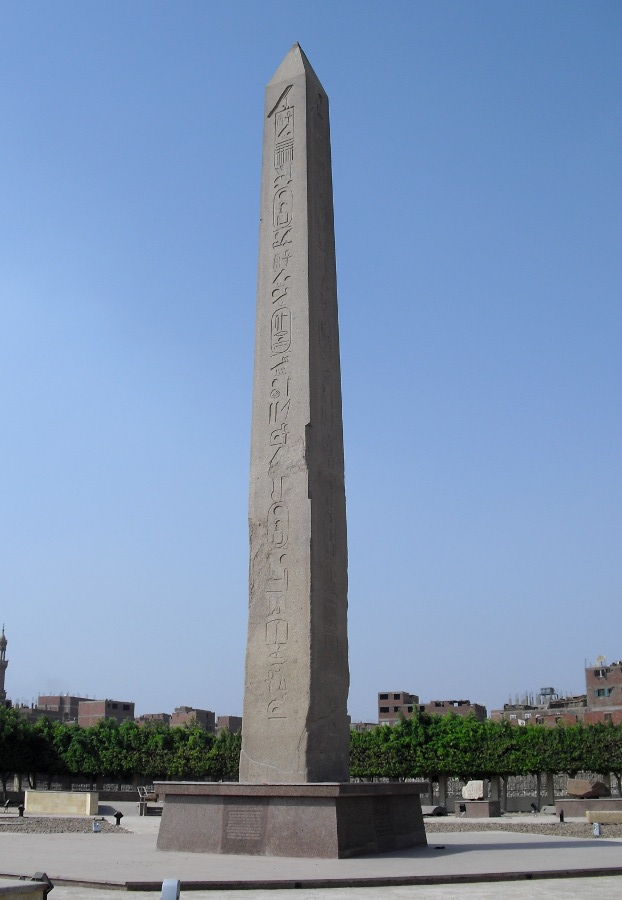
Last surviving remnant of the Temple of Ra-Atum at Heliopolis, the obelisk, erected by Senusret I of the Twelfth Dynasty

Atum was worshiped throughout Egypt's history; the center of his worship centered on the city of Heliopolis (Egyptian: Annu or Iunu). The only surviving remnant of Heliopolis is the Temple of Ra-Atum obelisk located in Al-Masalla of Al-Matariyyah, Cairo. It was erected by Senusret I of the Twelfth Dynasty, and still stands in its original position. In the Old Kingdom Atum was at the center of the Egyptian belief system, being partly responsible for the origins of existence, having created himself and everything else out of the primordial waters. He is believed to have been present in ideology as early as predynastic times, becoming even more prevalent during the Old Kingdom as indicated by the pyramid texts in which he appears frequently. He continues to be found in the Middle Kingdom, during which he is depicted in the Book of the Dead in which he appears in spells to help with the journey to the Afterlife. Later, in the New Kingdom, there cults attributed to Atum, such as the Theban royal high priestesses known as the Divine Adoratrices of Amun who acted as the Hand of Atum in temple rituals at the time. Ra would take center stage later on but as Atum was overshadowed, the people of ancient Egypt would continue to worship him through cultic rituals in which he is depicted as having close relationships with the king, as well as being represented through lizards on small reliquaries and amulets closer to the Late Period.

== See also ==
- Animal mummy § Miscellaneous animals
- Cosmic Man
- List of solar deities
- Solar myths
