= Shu (god) =

Ancient Egyptian primordial god

- The ancient Egyptian god Shu is represented as a human with feathers on his head, as he is associated with dry and warm air. This feather serves as the hieroglyphic sign for his name. Shu has also been represented as a lion, or with a more elaborate feathered headdress.
Name in hieroglyphs
N37 H6 G43 A40
- Major cult center: Heliopolis, Leontopolis
- Symbol: the ostrich feather

Genealogy
- Parents: Ra or Atum and Iusaaset or Menhit
- Siblings: Tefnut; Hathor; Sekhmet; Bastet
- Consort: Tefnut
- Offspring: Nut and Geb

Equivalents
- Greek: Atlas

Shu (Egyptian: šw, "emptiness" or "he who rises up"), also known as Sosis (Ancient Greek: Σῶσις, Sôsis) was one of the primordial Egyptian gods, spouse and brother to the goddess Tefnut, and one of the nine deities of the Ennead of the Heliopolis cosmogony. He was the god of light, peace, lions, air, and wind.

== Family ==
In Heliopolitan theology, Atum created the first couple of the Ennead, Shu and Tefnut, through masturbation and spitting, respectively. Shu was the father of Nut and Geb and grandfather of Osiris, Isis, Set, and Nephthys. His great-grandsons are Horus and Anubis.

== Myths ==
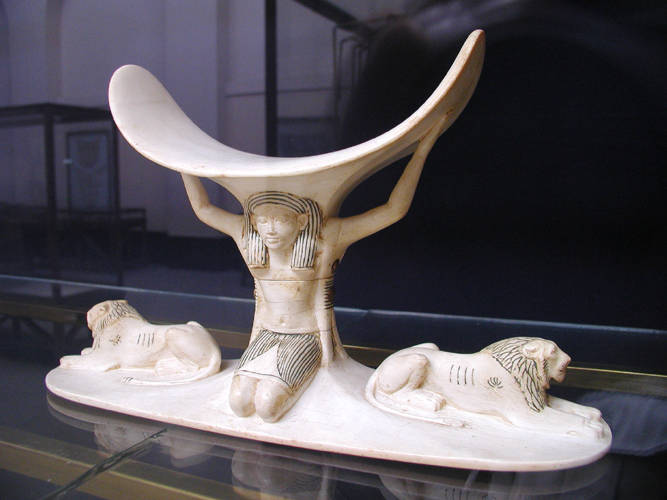
Headrest that depicts the god Shu holding up the sky

The god Shu (the air) separating to the goddess Nut (the Sky) and the god Geb (the Earth).

Drawing of Shu with a more elaborate feathered headdress similar to Onuris.

As the air, Shu was considered to be a cooling, and thus a calming influence and pacifier. Due to the association with dry air, calm, and thus Ma'at (truth, justice, order, and balance), Shu was depicted as the dry air/atmosphere between the Earth and sky, separating the two realms after the event of the First Occasion. Shu was also portrayed in art as wearing an ostrich feather. Shu was seen with between one and four feathers. The ostrich feather was symbolic of lightness and emptiness. Fog and clouds were also Shu's elements and they were often called his bones. Because of his position between the sky and Earth, he was also known as the wind.

In a much later myth, representing a terrible weather disaster at the end of the Old Kingdom, it's said that Tefnut and Shu once argued, and Tefnut left Egypt for Nubia (which was always more temperate). It was said that Shu quickly decided that he missed her, but she changed into a cat that destroyed any man or god that approached. Thoth, disguised, eventually succeeded in convincing her to return.

The Greeks associated Shu with Atlas, the primordial Titan who held up the celestial spheres, as they are both depicted holding up the sky.

According to the Heliopolitan cosmology, Shu and Tefnut, the first pair of cosmic elements, created the sky goddess, Nut, and the Earth god, Geb. Shu separated Nut from Geb as they were in the act of love, creating duality in the manifest world: above and below, light and dark, good and evil. Prior to their separation, however, Nut had given birth to the gods Isis, Osiris, Nephthys (Horus) and Set. The Egyptians believed that if Shu did not hold Nut (sky) and Geb (Earth) apart there would be no way for physically-manifest life to exist.

Shu is mostly represented as a human. Only in his function as a fighter and defender of the sun god is he sometimes depicted with a lion's head. He carries an ankh, the symbol of life.

== Art ==
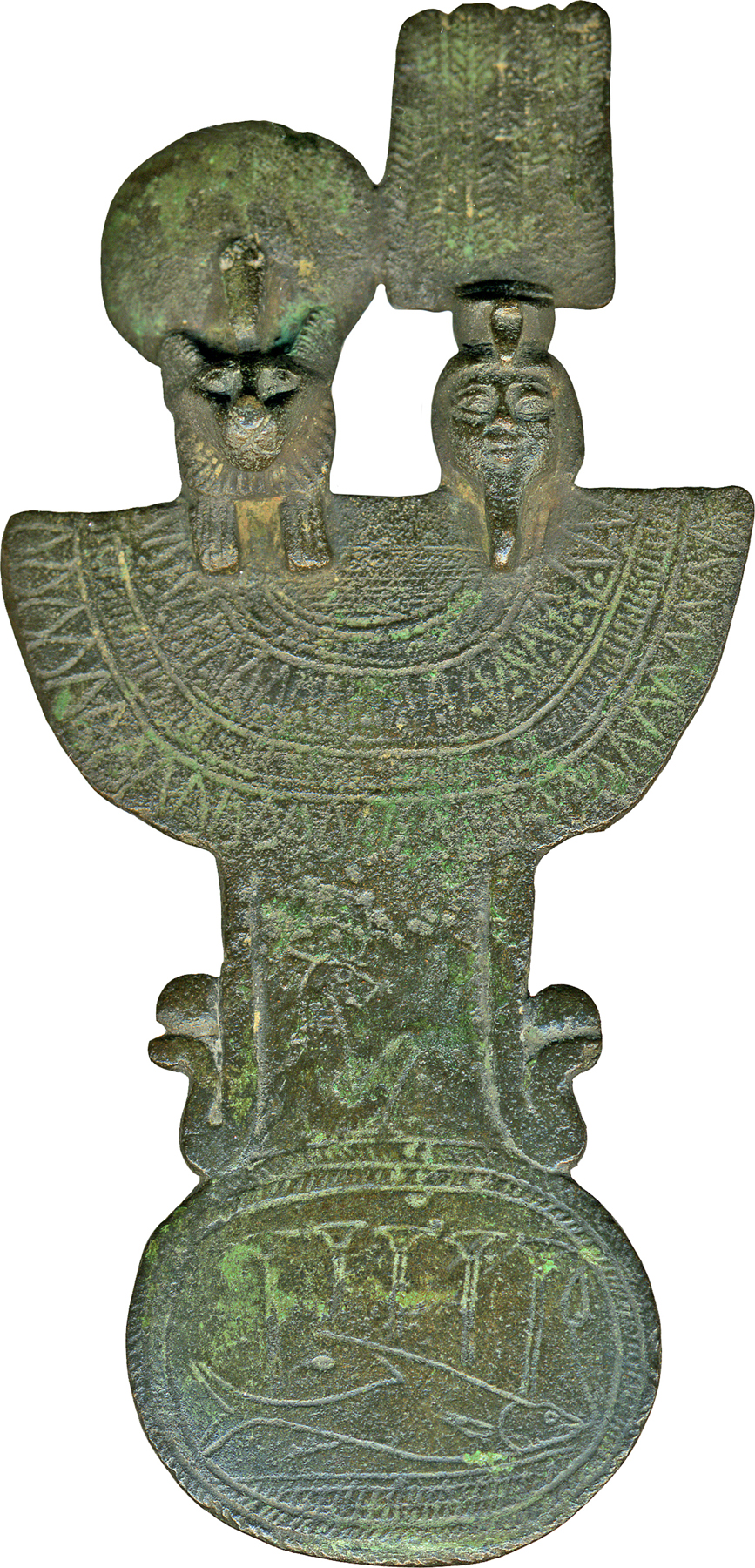
Used as a counterweight for an ancient Egyptian menat

Menat counterweights ensured that these intricate beaded necklaces stayed in place as the wearer moved around. This counterweight (left image) is a bronze adornment from 722-332 BCE. It depicts the heads of Shu (rightmost head) alongside his sister Tefnut, goddess of moisture (leftmost head). Tefnut is rendered as a lioness with a mane wearing a uraeus, wig, and sun disk. Shu is shown dressed in a false beard, shorter wig, and a crown that includes a modius, tall feathers, and a uraeus. Together, it was believed that these two deities would protect the wearer from worldly dangers. Two serpents flank the counterweight near the bottom where an oxyrhynchus fish can also be seen.

== See also ==
- Anhur-Shu
- Sopdu
