= Richard Anthony Parker =

Richard Anthony Parker (December 10, 1905 – June 3, 1993) was a prominent Egyptologist and professor of Egyptology. Originally from Chicago, he attended Mt. Carmel High School (then known as St. Cyril) with acclaimed author James T. Farrell. He received an A.B. from Dartmouth College in 1930, and a Ph.D. in Egyptology from the University of Chicago in 1938. He then went to Luxor, Egypt to work as an epigrapher with the University of Chicago's Epigraphic and Architectural Survey, studying the mortuary temple of Ramses III. When World War II necessitated a temporary halt to the project, Parker came back to Chicago to teach Egyptology at the university. In 1946, he returned to Egypt to continue his work on the epigraphic survey, and soon rose to the position of field director.

In 1948, he founded the Department of Egyptology at Brown University and became its first chairman, and also assumed the newly created position of the Charles Edwin Wilbour Professorship. That year, Parker also began his service as a founding trustee of the American Research Center in Egypt.

Parker's primary interests were in ancient science and mathematics. In 1951, he traveled to Egypt to examine monuments linked to ancient astronomy, and in subsequent years studied papyri at Paris, Florence, Vienna, Copenhagen and Oxford, in Britain. His major contributions included significant work in the areas of Egyptian language (including Demotic), astronomy, and chronology. Of particular note was his discovery that two ancient Egyptian calendars were employed simultaneously: a 365-day calendar used for administrative needs, and a lunar calendar used for religious and agricultural purposes. Parker's work in this area continues to influence Egyptological research.

In 1971, British Academy elected Parker as a corresponding fellow, the highest accolade for scholarship given in Great Britain. He was the only American Egyptologist selected for membership in the society. Parker also served on the visiting committees of Harvard University’s department of Middle Eastern Civilizations, and was a member of the department of Egyptian art at the Boston Museum of Fine Arts.

Parker was a devoted fan of Brown University football, and was noted for forgoing trips abroad so as not to miss a home game.

== Publications ==
- Medinet Habu Demotic Ostracon 4038 (1938) (doctoral dissertation; a revised version was published in Volume XXVI (1940) of the Journal of Egyptian Archaeology under the title A Late Demotic Gardening Agreement: Medinet Habu Ostracon 4038)
- Babylonian Chronology 626 B.C. - A.D. 45 (Brown University Press, 1942 [reprinted 1956]) PDF
- The Calendars of Ancient Egypt, The Oriental institute of the University of Chicago, Studies in Ancient Oriental Civilization 26, University of Chicago Press, 1950, PDF
- Sothic Dates and Calendar Adjustment
- The Problem of the Month-Names: A Reply (1957)
- Lunar Dates of Thutmose III and Ramesses II (Journal of Near Eastern Studies, 1957)
- A Vienna Demotic Papyrus on Eclipse- and Lunar-Omina (Brown University Press, 1959)
- Egyptian Astronomical Texts (with O. Neugebauer) (1960)
- A Saite Oracle Papyrus From Thebes (with J. Cerny) (Brown University Press, 1962)
- Two Demotic Astronomical Papyri in the Carlsberg Collection PDF AcOr 26 (1962), pp.143-147
- Egyptian Astronomical Texts, III. Decans, Planets, Constellations and Zodiacs (Brown University Press, 1969)
- The Calendars and Chronology, the Legacy of Egypt (1971)
- Demotic Mathematical Papyri (Brown University Press, 1972)
- Ancient Egyptian Astronomy, the Place of Astronomy in the Ancient World (Oxford University Press, 1974)
- The Sothic Dating of the Twelfth and Eighteenth Dynasties (pp.177-190) in 'Studies in Honor of George R. Hughes' The Oriental Institute of the University of Chicago, Studies in Ancient Oriental Civilization 39, January 12, 1977 PDF
- The Edifice of Taharqa by the Sacred Lake of Karnak (with Jean Leclant and Jean Claude Goyon) (Brown University Press, 1979)
- Egyptological Studies in Honor of Richard A. Parker: Presented on the Occasion of His 78th Birthday (Leonard H. Lesko, ed.) (1986)
