= The Blinding of Truth by Falsehood =

Ancient Egyptian story

"The Blinding of Truth by Falsehood", also known as The Tale of Truth and Falsehood, is an Ancient Egyptian story from the 19th Dynasty of the New Kingdom Period. It is found on Papyrus Chester Beatty II and narrates the dispute that occurs between Maat (Truth), his unnamed son, and Gereg (Falsehood).

== Papyrus Chester Beatty II ==
The papyrus on which the tale was found is known as Papyrus Chester Beatty II. It dates to the New Kingdom's 19th Dynasty, and there does not seem to be disagreement about this date as many scholarly sources agree on this date. Papyrus is also created from the plant of the same name and can be carbon dated because it is organic matter (Strudwick 484). It is written in hieratic script, the simplified/cursive form of hieroglyphics (Strudwick 482). Papyrus Chester Beatty II was found in fragments at Thebes in Upper Egypt, and like most discoveries found at Thebes, it is mostly religious with political overtones. It was donated to the British Museum in 1930 and has been there ever since, but it is not on display ("Collection Object Details: Papyrus Chester Beatty 2").

== Literary background ==
The story fits into the genres of melodrama (a narrative in which evil momentarily gains the upper hand) and partial allegory (Vinson 33; Griffiths 90). Its themes are the triumph of maat (order, peace, truth, justice) over isfet (chaos) and how "truth must be vindicated against the wiles of falsehood" (Vinson 48; Griffiths 91).

== Story ==
Author Steve Vinson gives the following summary of "The Blinding of Truth by Falsehood" in his article "The Accent's on Evil: Ancient Egyptian 'Melodrama' and the Problem of Genre:"

Gereg (Falsehood) claims that Ma'at (Truth) has stolen a dagger from him, and he convinces the Ennead (the nine original gods in the Heliopolitan creation myth) of the truth of his allegation. The Ennead permits Gereg to blind Ma'at and forces Ma'at to serve Gereg as door-keeper. However, Ma'at performs his task virtuously and well, and eventually Gereg can't stand his presence any more. Gereg orders two of Ma'at's servants to take him out into the desert where, so Gereg hopes, Ma'at will be devoured by lions. But the servants let Ma'at escape, and Ma'at takes refuge in the home of a beautiful lady, with whom he has a son. The son grows up, learns the truth of who his father is and how he had been treated by Gereg and demands justice before the Ennead. Gereg, sure that Ma'at must be long dead, swears an oath that if Ma'at is found alive and blinded as the son alleges, then he will willingly suffer blindness himself. When Ma'at's son produces Ma'at, Gereg is, in fact, blinded and sentenced by the gods to serve Ma'at as doorkeeper. (Vinson 47)

== Implications of "The Blinding of Truth by Falsehood" ==
There are many implications. Some of these consequences are religious and cultural. One of them is the importance and popularity of certain myths in Ancient Egypt. The relationship between myth and literature in Ancient Egypt is that myths are generally integrated into literature, and "The Blinding of Truth by Falsehood" chooses to integrate the Osiris and the Horus and Seth/Set myths (Baines 377; Griffiths 90). Despite the many parallels to these two myths, it is only a partial allegory rather than a full one (Griffiths 90). It only concerns the names of the characters and is not used enough to make this story a full allegory (Griffiths 90-91).

Another religious and cultural implication involves the theme of "The Blinding of Truth by Falsehood:" the triumph of ma'at over isfet (Vinson 33). Ma'at had existed since creation but was in a constant struggle with the forces of chaos (Strudwick 366). If order broke down, chaos would follow (Strudwick 366). This concept is so important is it made the moral of "The Blinding of Truth by Falsehood." The tale's allegorical nature downplays the narrative's mythological aspect in order to highlight an important moral that Egyptians wanted to ensure in their society and culture (Baines 374). This would guarantee that ma'at would continue and ultimately triumph over chaos.

Other implications are political and historical. Since "The Blinding of Truth by Falsehood" uses the myth involving Horus and Seth, it brings up the problem of succession that drives the main conflict in that myth (Strudwick 118). At this time in Egypt, Ramesses II was on the throne of Egypt and a new dynasty was in control of the country (Lesko 99). Ramesses would have commissioned this in order to legitimize his own reign and succession as well as the new dynasty through this story (Lesko 100). Author Leonard Lesko even goes as far as to say that this is deliberate political propaganda (Lesko 100). Its audience would have to be a large one. Propaganda (legitimizing succession in this case) is meant to be seen by lots of people, not be kept hidden, and the popular myths it contains would help it reach a wide audience as well. This means that the source is also biased because it would be on the side of Ramesses II in order to secure his status in Egypt.

This myth also demonstrates the importance of ma'at in political terms. The pharaoh was the one who essentially keeps it by defeating Egypt's enemies, pleasing the gods as their high priest, restoring what was broken, and more (Strudwick 366). Ma'at's role is also seen in the important role the judicial system plays (Campagno 25). The main conflict between Truth and Falsehood is settled essentially in court with the Ennead acting as judge and jury (Campagno 26). The law and the order, truth, and justice that goes with it is personified by ma'at (Strudwick 366).

The final implications of this story are social. It reveals the social aspect of ma'at: harmony "between and amongst gods and human beings" (Vinson 47-48). "The Blinding of Truth by Falsehood" also illuminates the role of women at this point in Egyptian history. There seemed to be negativity towards the influential roles women played in the previous dynasty, and it manifests itself in this piece (Lesko 102). Ma'at, a female concept, is made male (Baines 374). The woman in the tale only exists to desire Truth and conceive his son; she does not play a major part (Vinson 47). This is in stark contrast to the major role the goddess Isis plays in the original Osiris myth (Griffiths 90).

== Secondary analysis and further reading ==
There have been many scholars who have commented on "The Blinding of Truth by Falsehood." The following selections used to research this entry give great discussions on this source and provide opportunities to further knowledge on the subject.

The first analysis comes from the following two books: Miriam Lichtheim's Ancient Egyptian Literature: Volume II: The New Kingdom and William Simpson's The Literature of Ancient Egypt: An Anthology of Stories, Instructions, Stelae, Autobiographies, and Poetry. Both of these books have translations of "The Blinding of Truth by Falsehood" and provide some insight into this primary source with their introductions to the selection and in the footnotes (Lichtheim 211; Simpson 104-107).

John Baines's chapter called "Myth and Literature" in Ancient Egyptian Literature: History and Forms gives great analysis. In this selection, Baines explores the relationship between myth and literature in Ancient Egypt. He concludes that myths are generally integrated into literature in order to transmit morality as well as cultural values and concerns. Baines also provides plenty of analysis as it relates to the best example of integrating myth and literature--"The Tale of Truth and Falsehood". He points out how changing the villain to a woman transforms the role of Seth, and the story's role as an allegory diminishes its wide-ranging significance to highlight morality. Naming the father ma'at could mean that the narrative should be understood as the full realization of the ma'at concept (Baines 361-377).

"Two Observations on the Tales of 'The Contendings of Horus and Seth' and 'Truth and Falsehood'" by Marcelo Campagno in the journal Trabajos de Egiptología - Papers on Ancient Egypt is another good analysis. His comparison of "The Contendings of Horus and Seth" and "The Blinding of Truth by Falsehood" reveals two major similarities between the famous stories. One of the parallels the author discusses is how both stories make use of myths involving Osiris, Isis, Seth, and Horus. However, there are differences between the many versions of the myths. The second parallel between the two stories is that both stories seek judicial solutions to the main conflict. It seems like the judicial systems in each one are different, and it relates to how important kinship and "state 'logics'" are in the stories and in Egypt. This article is important in understanding the primary source for these reasons, and because the truth and justice involved in a judicial solution is another example of the triumph of ma'at over isfet (Campagno 19-30).

J. Gwynn Griffith's journal article "Allegory in Greece and Egypt" found in The Journal of Egyptian Archaeology researching allegory in the eastern Mediterranean region provides good information on "The Tale of Truth and Falsehood." First of all, it provides many of the ways that this story relates to both the Osiris and the Horus and Seth myths. Griffiths is also clear to point out that "The Tale of Truth and Falsehood" is a partial allegory that illustrates the influence of two popular myths in society at the time. The article also establishes the theme— "truth must be vindicated against the wiles of falsehood" (Griffiths 79-102).

"Three Late Egyptian Stories Reconsidered" by Leonard Lesko analyzes major literary works such as "The Blinding of Truth by Falsehood" in order to determine "political realities." The author discovers several themes throughout these works including succession, negativity towards influential women, and "irreligiosity toward the gods." Lesko claims that the transition from the 18th to the 19th Dynasties is the reason for these themes in the works mentioned in his study. A new family needed to stabilize succession, there was negative sentiment towards the powerful 18th Dynasty females, and Ramses the Great deified himself. The new family could use these popular stories as propaganda and legitimize their new dynasty. This research is important to the study of the primary source because many of these political themes are evident in "The Blinding of Truth by Falsehood" (Lesko 98-103).

Steve Vinson's journal article "The Accent's on Evil: Ancient Egyptian 'Melodrama' and the Problem of Genre" from the Journal of the American Research Center in Egypt tries to discover what "genre" means as it relates to Egyptian literature and how to distinguish between them. The author tries to do this through analyzing many important Egyptian narratives such as "The Tale of Truth and Falsehood" in terms of "plot and characterization." There is a lot of information in this article about "The Tale of Truth and Falsehood." Vinson categorizes the primary source as a "melodrama" where evil momentarily gains the upper hand and as an allegory. Vinson also provides the story's theme—ma'at will triumph over isfet (Vinson 33-54).

== Bibliography ==
- Baines, John 1996. “Myth and Literature.” In Loprieno, Antonio (ed.), Ancient Egyptian Literature: History and Forms, 361-377. Leiden; New York; Köln: E. J. Brill.
- Campagno, Marcelo 2005. “Two Observations on the Tales of ‘The Contendings of Horus and Seth’ and ‘Truth and Falsehood.’” Trabajos de Egiptología - Papers on Ancient Egypt 4, 19-30.
- "Collection Object Details: Papyrus Chester Beatty 2." British Museum. Accessed January 30, 2016. https://www.britishmuseum.org/research/collection_online/collection_object_details.aspx?objectId=111739&partId=1&searchText=papyrus+chester+beatty+ii&page=1
- Griffiths, J. Gwyn. 1967. “Allegory in Greece and Egypt.” The Journal of Egyptian Archaeology 53. Egypt Exploration Society: 79–102. doi:10.2307/3855578
- Lesko, Leonard H. 1986. “Three Late Egyptian Stories Reconsidered.” In Lesko, Leonard H. (ed.), Egyptological Studies in Honor of Richard A. Parker: Presented on the Occasion of His 78th Birthday December 10, 1983, 98-103. Hanover; London: University Press of New England for Brown University Press.
- Lichtheim, Miriam. Ancient Egyptian Literature: Volume II: The New Kingdom. Berkeley, CA: University of California Press, 1978.
- Simpson, William K., ed. The Literature of Ancient Egypt: An Anthology of Stories, Instructions, Stelae, Autobiographies, and Poetry. 3rd ed. New Haven: Yale University Press, 2003.
- Strudwick, Helen, ed. The Encyclopedia of Ancient Egypt. New York: Metro Books, 2013.
- Vinson, Steve. 2004. “The Accent's on Evil: Ancient Egyptian ‘Melodrama’ and the Problem of Genre.” Journal of the American Research Center in Egypt 41. American Research Center in Egypt: 33–54. doi:10.2307/20297186
