= Souls of Pe and Nekhen =

Supernatural beings in ancient Egyptian religion

Pe and Nekhen
- The souls of Nekhen (jackal) and Pe (falcon) kneeling atop Nome standards
Name in hieroglyphs
G30 p Z1 niwtPe G30 nxn Z1 niwtNekhen

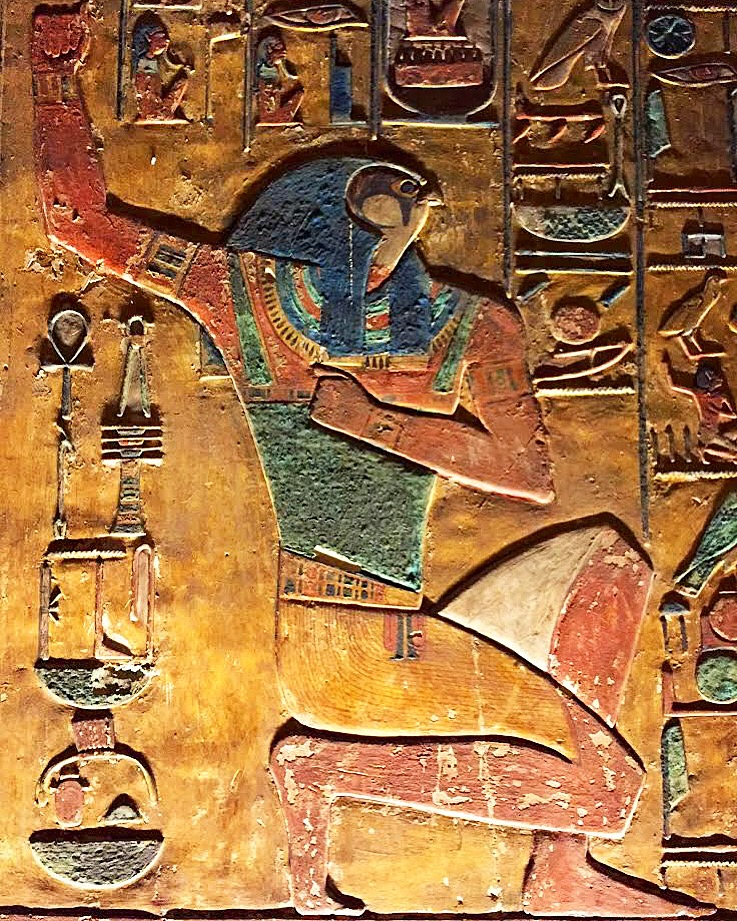
Soul of Pe

The Souls of Pe and Nekhen, mentioned first in the Pyramid Texts, refer to the ancestors of the ancient Egyptian kings. Nekhen (Greek Hierakonpolis) was the Upper Egyptian centre of the worship of the god Horus, whose successors the Egyptian pharaohs were thought to be. Pe (Greek Buto) was a Lower Egyptian town, not known for its Horus worship, but Ra had awarded the town to Horus after his eye was injured in the struggle for the throne of Egypt.

The approbation of their predecessors, even as mythological and nameless as the Souls of Pe and Nekhen, was important to the Egyptian kings, who referred to them in many inscriptions. Even the Kushite pharaohs saw themselves as descendants of the Souls of Pe and Nekhen.

It appears that the Souls of Heliopolis comprised the Souls of Pe and Nekhen.

The followers of Horus in ancient Egyptian is "Shemsu-Her".
