= Leonard H. Lesko =

American egyptologist

Leonard H. Lesko, born August 14, 1938 (age 87), is an American egyptologist. He was the chairman of the Department of Egyptology at Brown University and held the Charles Edwin Wilbour professorship. In 1961, he received a B.A. in Classics from Loyola University Chicago, and his masters in 1964. In 1969, he received a Ph.D. in "Near Eastern Languages and Civilizations-Egyptology" at the University of Chicago. Prior to joining the Brown faculty in 1982, he held various teaching positions at University of California-Berkeley.

Lesko is an expert in Egyptian languages including Old, Middle, and Late Egyptian, Demotic, and Coptic. He has also studied the Coffin Texts, the Book of the Dead and Deir el-Medina. Along with his wife, Barbara Lesko, he edited A Dictionary of Late Egyptian.

== Publications ==
- Lesko, Leonard H. (1977). King Tut's Wine Cellar. B.C. Scribe Publications. ISBN 978-0-930548-00-1.
- Parker, Richard Anthony (1986). Lesko, Leonard H. (ed.). Egyptological Studies in Honor of Richard A. Parker: Presented on the Occasion of His 78th Birthday, December 10, 1983. Brown University. ISBN 978-0-87451-321-9.
- Lesko, Leonard H.; Lesko, Barbara S. (2002). A Dictionary of Late Egyptian. B.C. Scribe Publications. ISBN 978-0-930548-14-8.
- Lesko, Leonard H. (January 1, 1977). The Ancient Egyptian Book of Two Ways. University of California Press. ISBN 978-0-520-03514-0.
- Ward, William A. (1998). Lesko, Leonard H. (ed.). Ancient Egyptian and Mediterranean Studies: In Memory of William A. Ward. Department of Egyptology, Brown University. ISBN 978-0-9662685-0-8.
- Dever, William G. (1997). Frerichs, Ernest S.; Lesko, Leonard H. (eds.). Exodus: The Egyptian Evidence. Winona Lake, Ind: Eisenbrauns. ISBN 1-57506-025-6.
- Lesko, Leonard H. (1979). Index of the Spells on Egyptian Middle Kingdom Coffins and Related Documents. Berkeley, Calif: B C Scribe Publications. ISBN 978-0-930548-02-5.
- Lesko, Leonard H. (1994). Pharaoh's Workers: The Villagers of Deir El Medina. Cornell University Press. ISBN 978-0-8014-8143-7.
- Baines, John; Lesko, Leonard H.; Silverman, David P. (1991). Religion in Ancient Egypt: Gods, Myths, and Personal Practice. Cornell University Press. ISBN 978-0-8014-2550-9.

== See also ==
- Richard Anthony Parker
