= Jubilee Pavilion (hieroglyph) =

Egyptian hieroglyph

O23 O23 W3
Jubilee
Pavilion
in hieroglyphs

The Jubilee Festival for the Pharaoh, the Heb Sed is represented in hieroglyphs by a Jubilee Pavilion Hieroglyph. It is Gardiner Sign Listed as no. O23. However it often appears with other pavilion, or festival hieroglyphs: the Hall, no. O22,

O22

and an alabaster Basin, no. W3.

W3

An alternate hieroglyph, the Basin combined with the Hall,

W4

is represented by Gardiner no. W4. A ligatured combination of the Basin with the Pavilion,

O23 W3

is shown in some iconographic scenes, (Ramses II, Temple of Amun at Karnak).

== The Pavilion hieroglyph ==
The pavilion hieroglyph is a side view of the pharaoh seated, in opposing views, wearing the two separate crowns, the crown of the South, the white crown, and the crown of the North (the Delta), the red crown. The pavilion is composed of two side views of the naos (hieroglyph), Gardiner no. O18.

O18

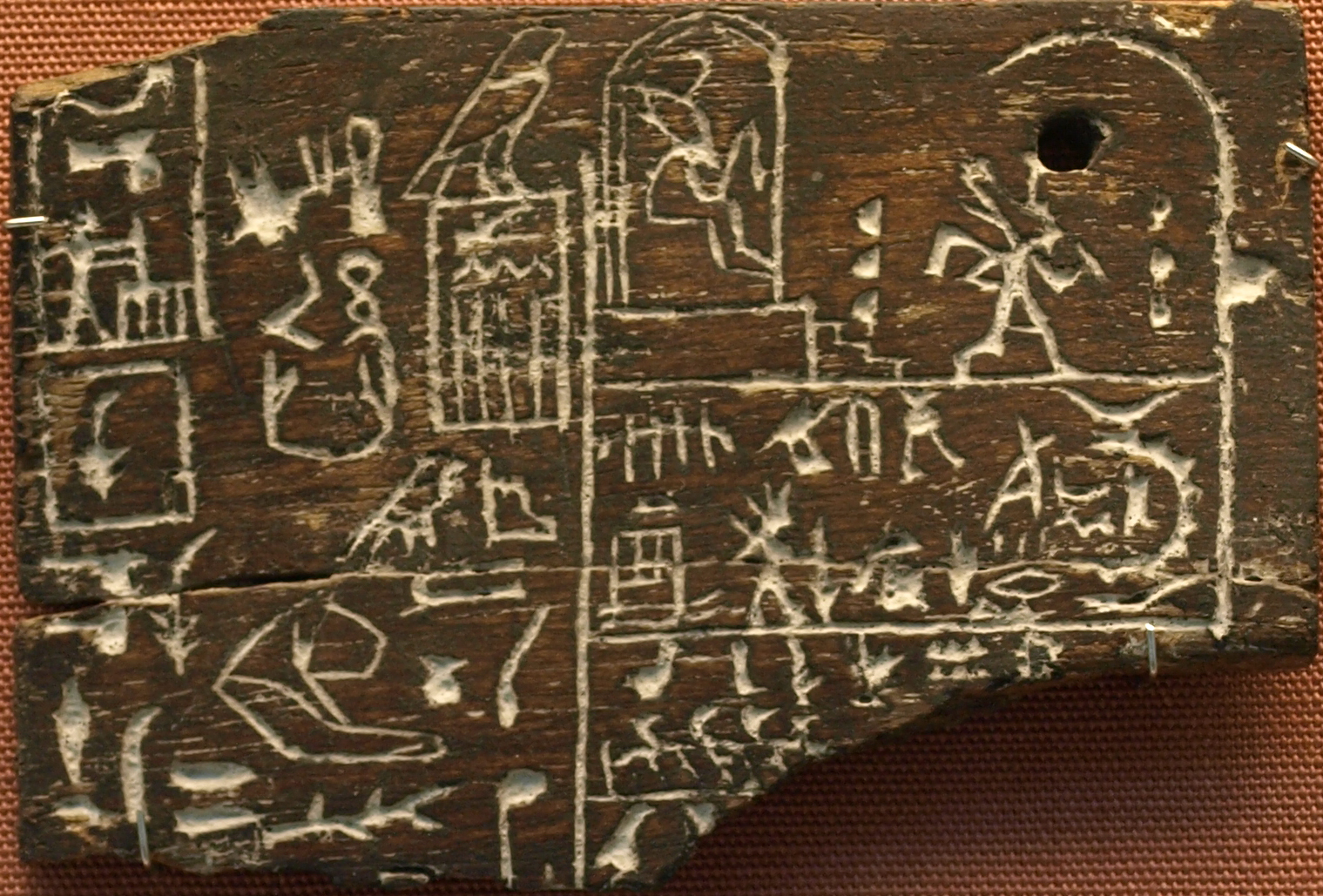
King Den label, Old Kingdom.

The early Old Kingdom labels, for example Pharaoh Den, portrayed him in a side view in his naos shrine. An example of the combined, opposed, view with the two crowns, is the lintel of Senusret II, 12th dynasty, 19th century BC. It shows the naos curved roofs of each half of the pavilion hieroglyph.

== Sed counterpoise amulet ==
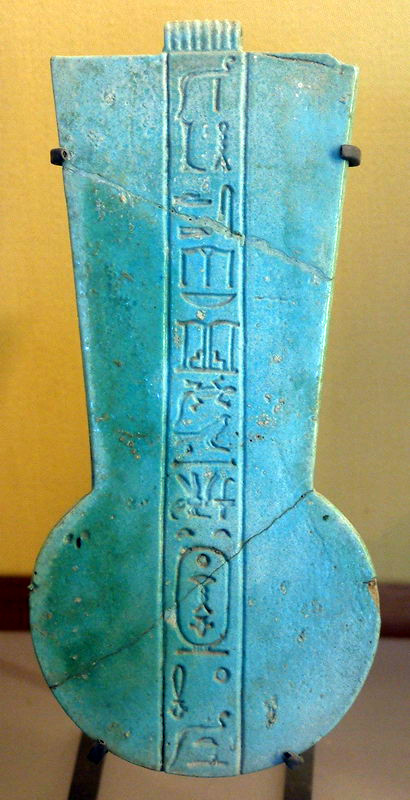
A counterpoise amulet (menat and counterpoise), celebrating the Heb-Sed, of Psammetichus I.

A counterpoise amulet, (menat and counterpoise), for Psammetichus I uses the three separate hieroglyphs for pavilion, hall, and basin. The sequence is hall-above-basin, then pavilion. What follows the three signs is a lizard (hieroglyph), then the Nesu-bity-name-(King of the South, King of the North) in the cartouche of Psammetichus II. (The lizard refers to the "multitudes", (the populace of Ancient Egypt).

The beginning of the text column with the Cobra-at-rest-(for speech), then states: "Hb-Sd", determinative-(?) Gard. no. N20,

N20

The complete text states approximately: "Announce: Heb-Sed, (The)-Multitudes, "Nesu-bity", Psammetichus II."

== See also ==
- Gardiner's Sign List#O. Buildings, Parts of Buildings, etc.
- List of Egyptian hieroglyphs
- Sed festival
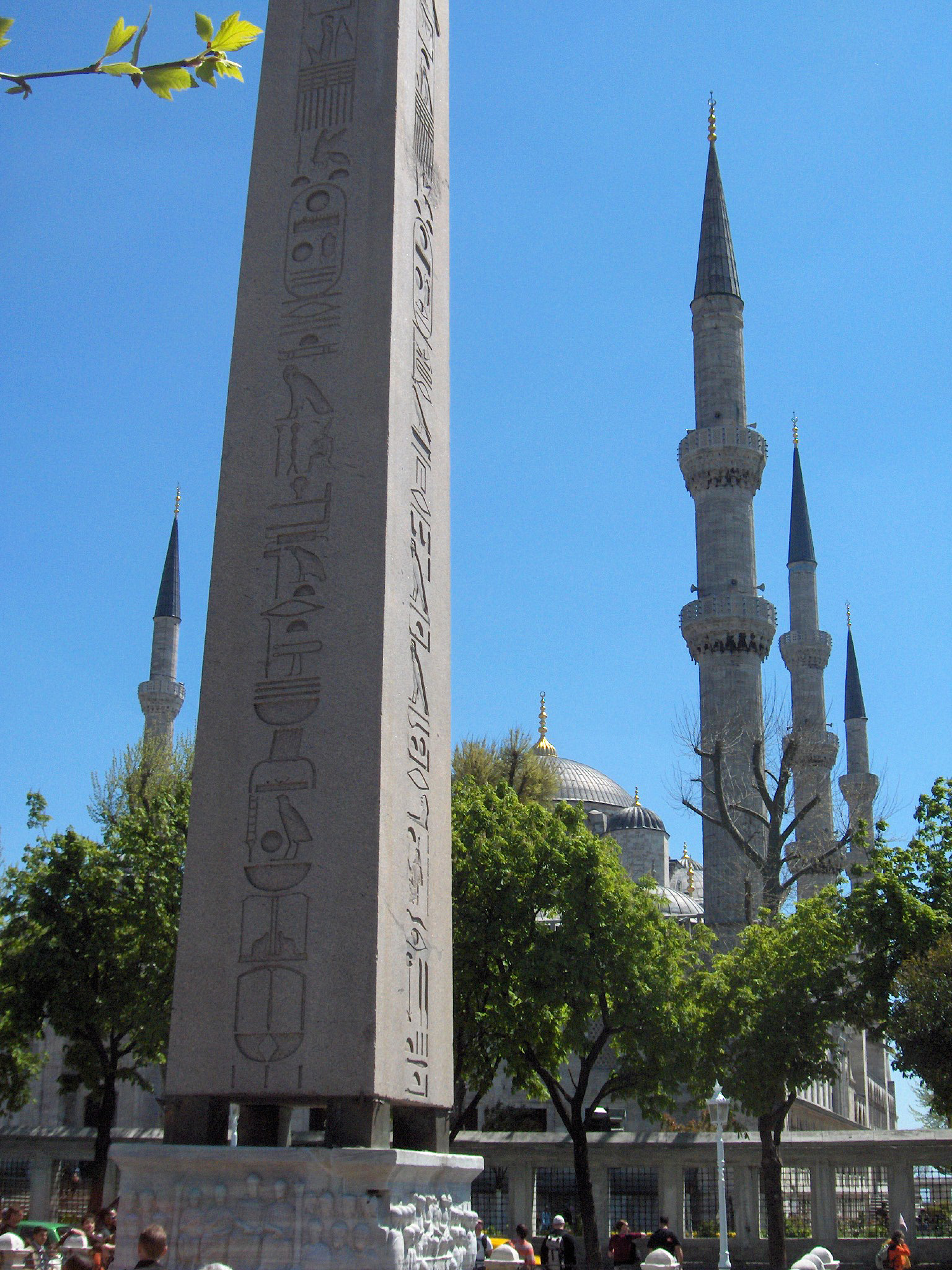
Thutmosis III obelisk

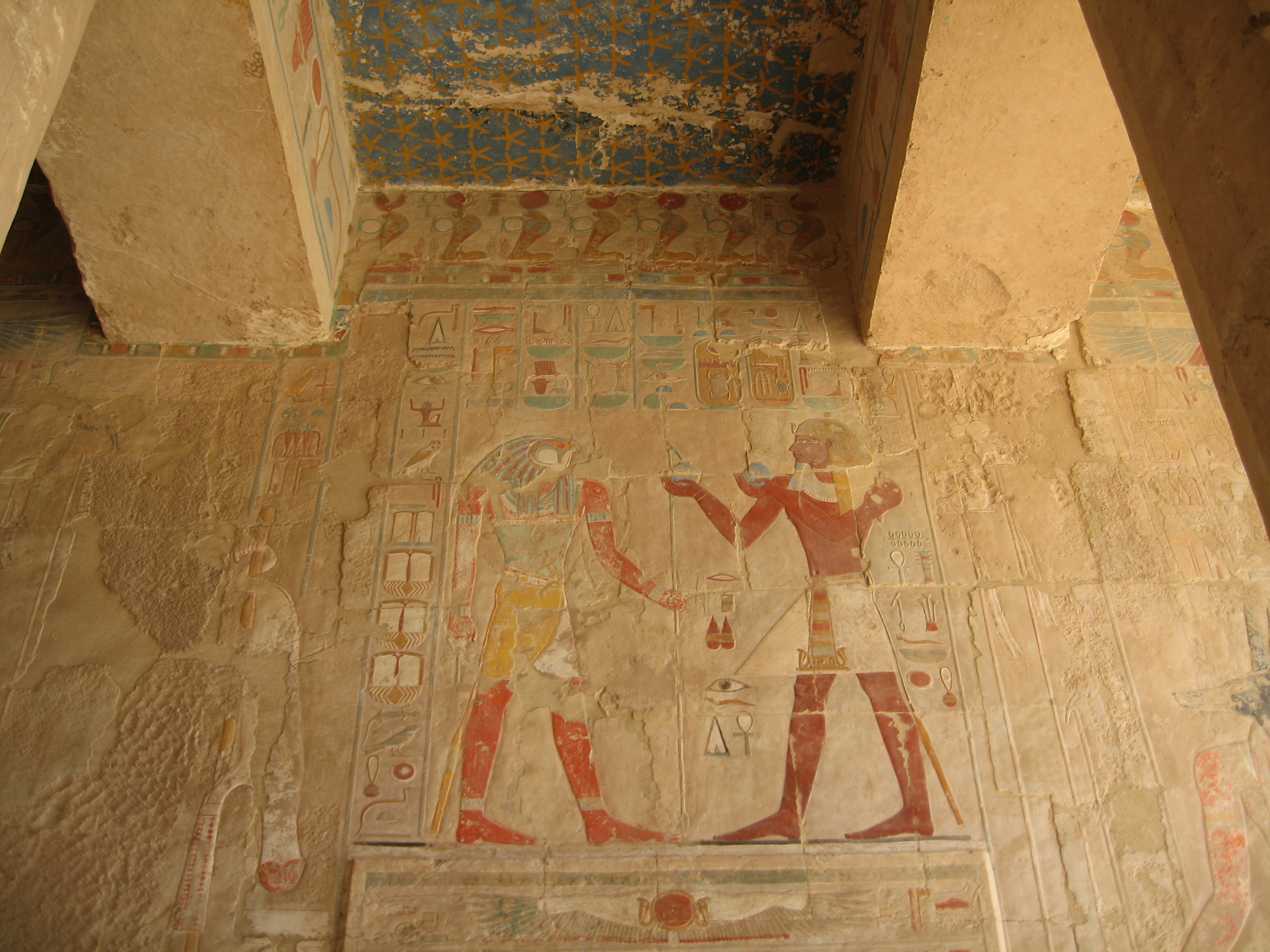
Three alabaster basins w/Hall, one basin w/Pavilion

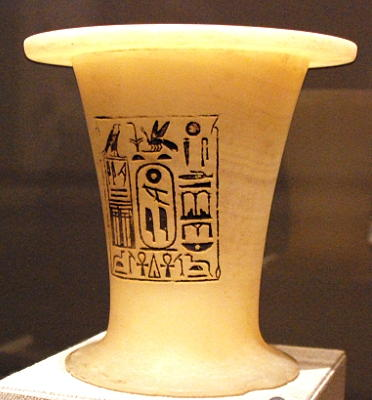
Pepi I Heb sed commemorative offering vessel; the right column states: "1st occurrence" S-d(hand), (?), 1-Pavilion, 2-Hall, 3-Festival (3 determinatives); (the "first occurrence" is the Archaic Dagger hieroglyph, and is "tp", (i.e. "top", (=beginning))
