= Malqata Menat =

Ancient Egyptian necklace

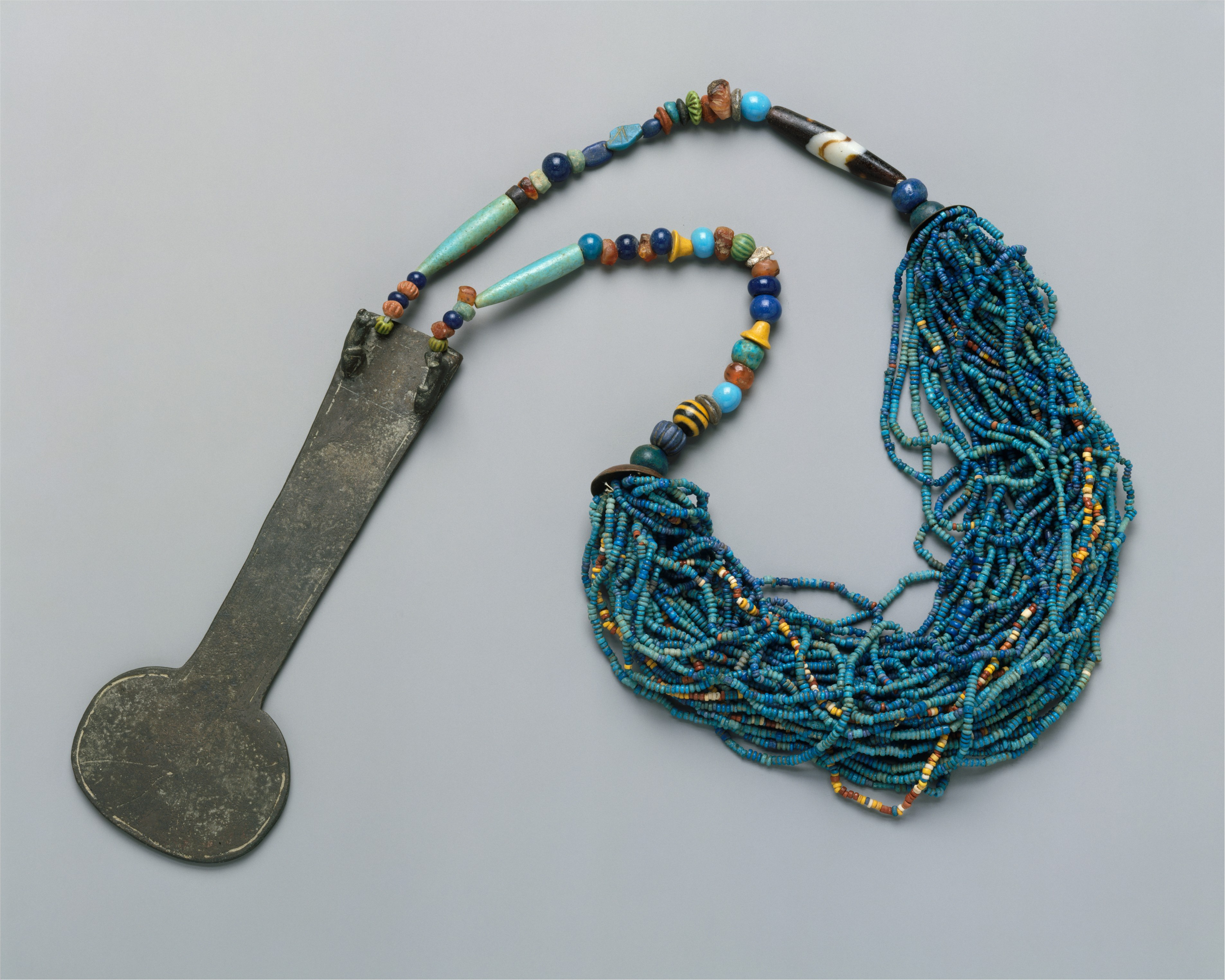
- Material: Faience
- Created: c. 1370 BC
- Discovered: 1910; Luxor, Egypt
- Present location: Metropolitan Museum of Art, New York, United States
- Identification: 11.215.450

The Malqata Menat was found by the Metropolitan Museum of Art Expedition in 1910, in a private house near the Heb Seds palace of Amenhotep III in Malkata, Thebes. A menat is a type of necklace made up of a series of strings of beads that form a broad collar and a metal counterpoise. The menat could be worn around the neck or held in the hand and rattled during cultic dances and religious processions.

== Provenance ==
In 1910, the excavations at Malqata were headed by Herbert Winlock, who led the Metropolitan Museum Expedition from 1910 to 1921. While excavating one of the private houses Winlock’s team found the menat, along with two other necklaces in the remnants of a linen satchel. Due to the early date of the excavation the exact provenance of the find is unknown. Excavation notes only specify that it was found in a corner of one of the rooms in a private house and that small traces of the linen bag the jewelry was stored in were still visible when it was discovered. At the end of the 1910 excavation season at Malkata, the Metropolitan Museum of Art and the Egyptian Antiquities Service, which was known as the Service des Antiquités de l'Egypte at that time, split the artifacts from the excavation season equally. The Metropolitan Museum acquired the Malqata menat in this division and the artifact is still part of the museum’s collection. It is currently on display at the Met Fifth Avenue in gallery 119.

== Menats ==
Menat necklaces are first attested in the Old Kingdom being worn by priestesses of the goddess Hathor. The goddess Hathor was associated with music and dance. Hathor's epithets include "Lady of Music", "Lady of the Chorus Dance" and "Lady of Inebriety, Jubilation and of Music". Priestesses of Hathor are often depicted in ancient Egyptian iconography shaking menats in Hathoric dances. According to Paul Barguet in his 1952 publication "L'Origine et la Signification du Contrepoids du Collier-menat", during the Middle Kingdom the goddess Mut was sometimes called, "Lady of the Menat". Menat necklaces functioned as a material fetish of Hathor, meaning "The menat could bring those who handled it in direct contact with the divine and impart to them the blessings of the goddess".

By the New Kingdom, menat necklaces were used by many different cults, not just by priestesses of Hathor. Menats were used in daily offering rituals in temples, in religious festivals and in funerary contexts. In scenes depicting daily offering rituals goddesses are often shown receiving menat necklaces as offerings. The menat was generally depicted being used in combination with the sistrum in cultic rites and dances performed by the priestesses of Hathor and other cultic dancers and musicians. The priestesses of Hathor rattled menat necklaces to honor the goddess Hathor. In ancient Egypt music was believed to calm the gods and placate their anger. The rattling sound that the menat made was intended to pacify the gods. Khener-troupes of dancers were often depicted shaking sistrums and menats. Menat necklaces are often found in funerary contexts both in iconography and in the material record. These goods were all used in the funerary dances depicted in New Kingdom tombs. There are countless depictions of priestess and temple singers with menats in New Kingdom funerary decorations.

The menat was used in many kingly rituals, such as, the Sed-festival and the king's coronation ceremony. In ancient Egypt, the personified goddess of music, Merit used songs and gestures to establish cosmic order. Menats were used by the God's Wives of Amun. The menat also seems to have been associated with protection, regeneration and rebirth, which may be why it was part of royal-divine interaction.
