= Naos (hieroglyph) =

Egyptian hieroglyph

O18
O21
Shrine (Naos)-O18
(O21-rectangular)
in hieroglyphs

Naos (Greek ναός "temple, shrine") is the descriptive name given to an Egyptian hieroglyph (Gardiner O18).

It is incorporated in another hieroglyph: The Jubilee pavilion hieroglyph is a side view of the pharaoh seated, in opposing views, wearing the two separate crowns, the crown of the South, the hedjet, and the crown of the North (the Nile Delta), the deshret. The pavilion is composed of two side views of the naos hieroglyph.

The early Old Kingdom labels, for example Pharaoh Den, portrayed him in a side view in his naos. An example of the combined, opposed, view with the two crowns, is the lintel of Senusret II, 12th Dynasty, 19th century BCE. It shows the naos' curved roofs of each half of the pavilion hieroglyph.

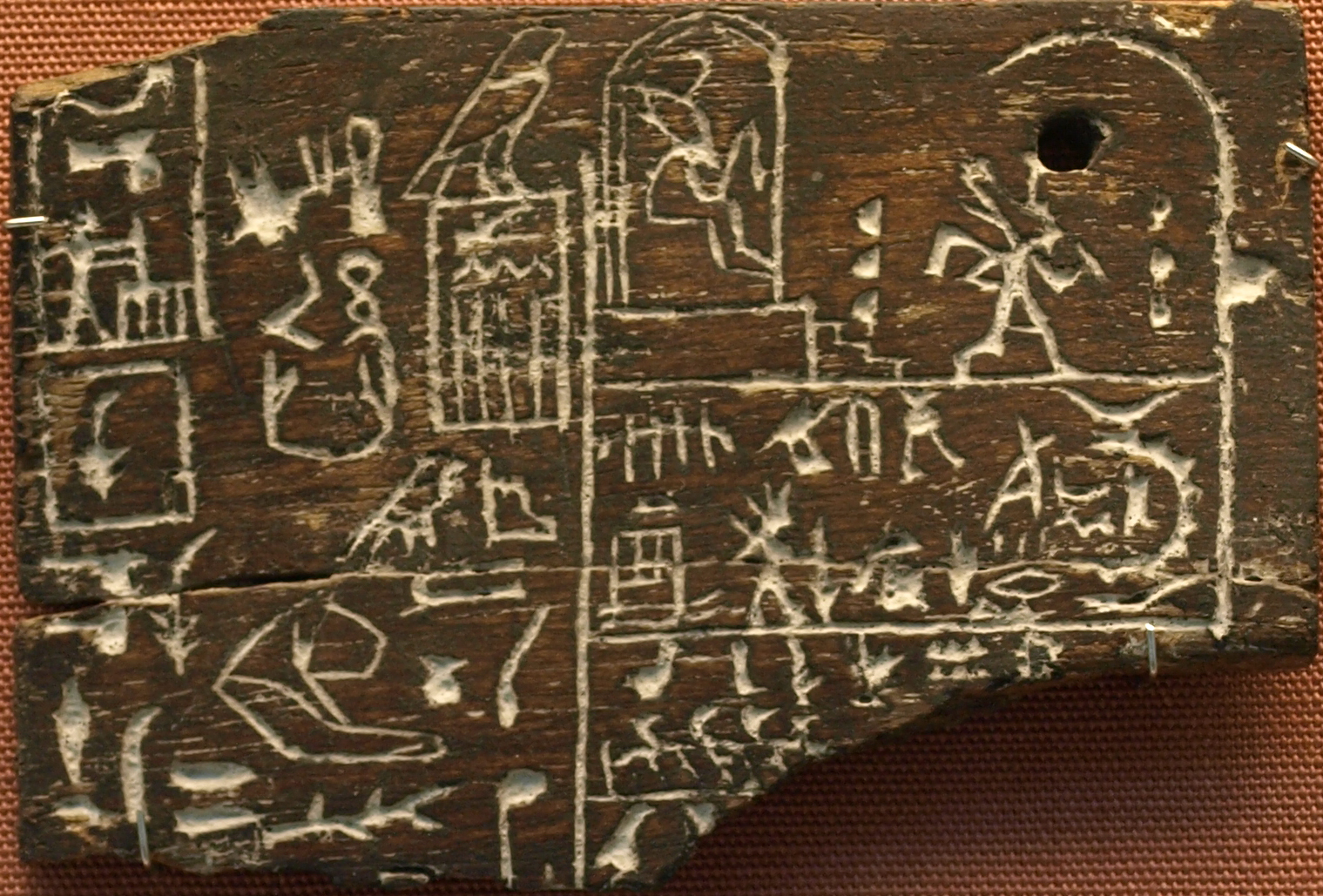
Pharaoh Den label, Old Kingdom of Egypt.

== Naophoros ==
A naophoros "temple-bearer" is a type of statue holding the naos symbol. An example is the Ramesside-era statue of Panehsy, overseer of the treasury. The earliest examples of such statues date to the 18th Dynasty.

== See also ==
- Gardiner's Sign List § O. Buildings, Parts of Building, etc.
- List of Egyptian hieroglyphs
- Jubilee Pavilion (hieroglyph)
