= Menat =

Ancient Egyptian necklace

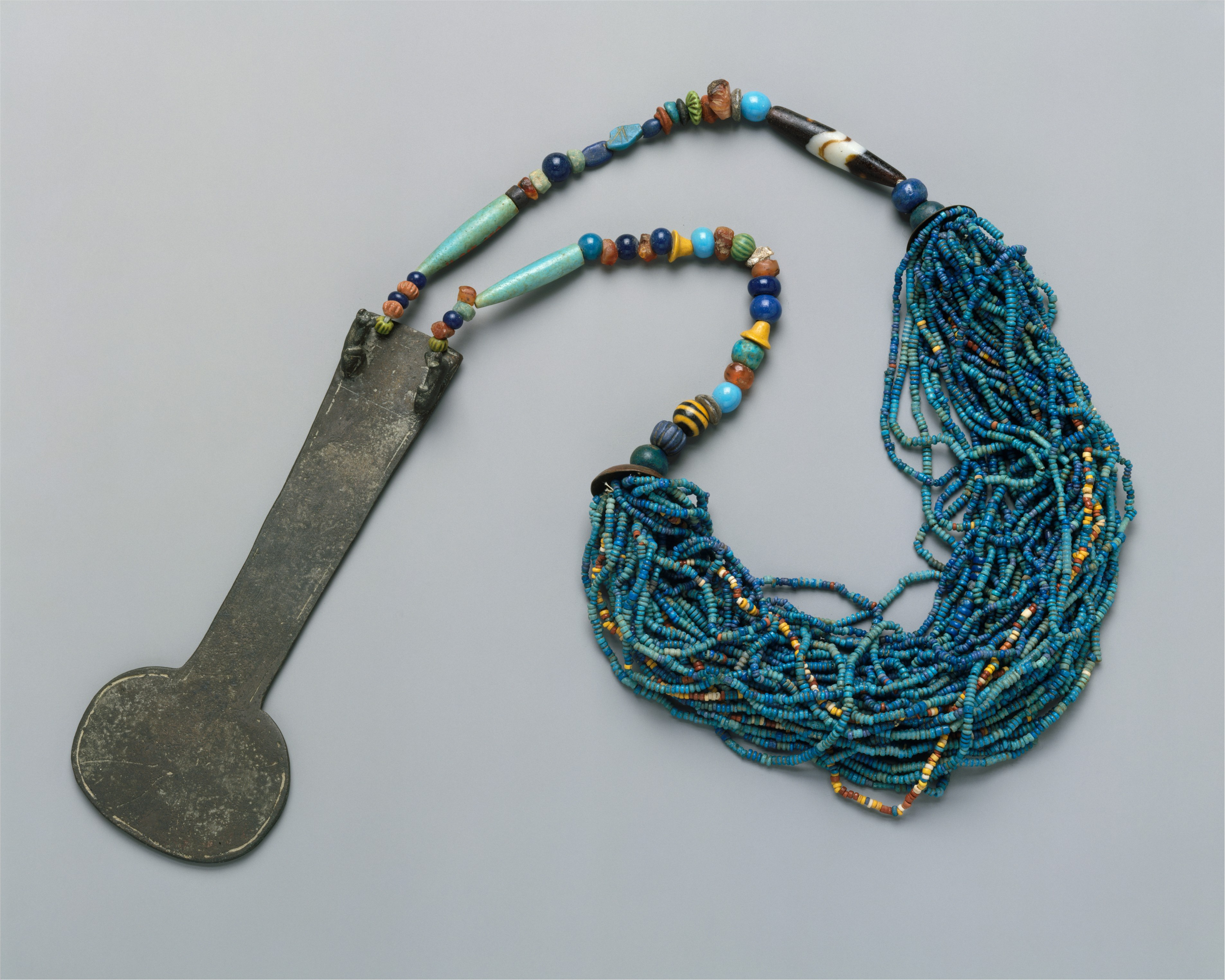
The Malqata Menat, late Eighteenth Dynasty

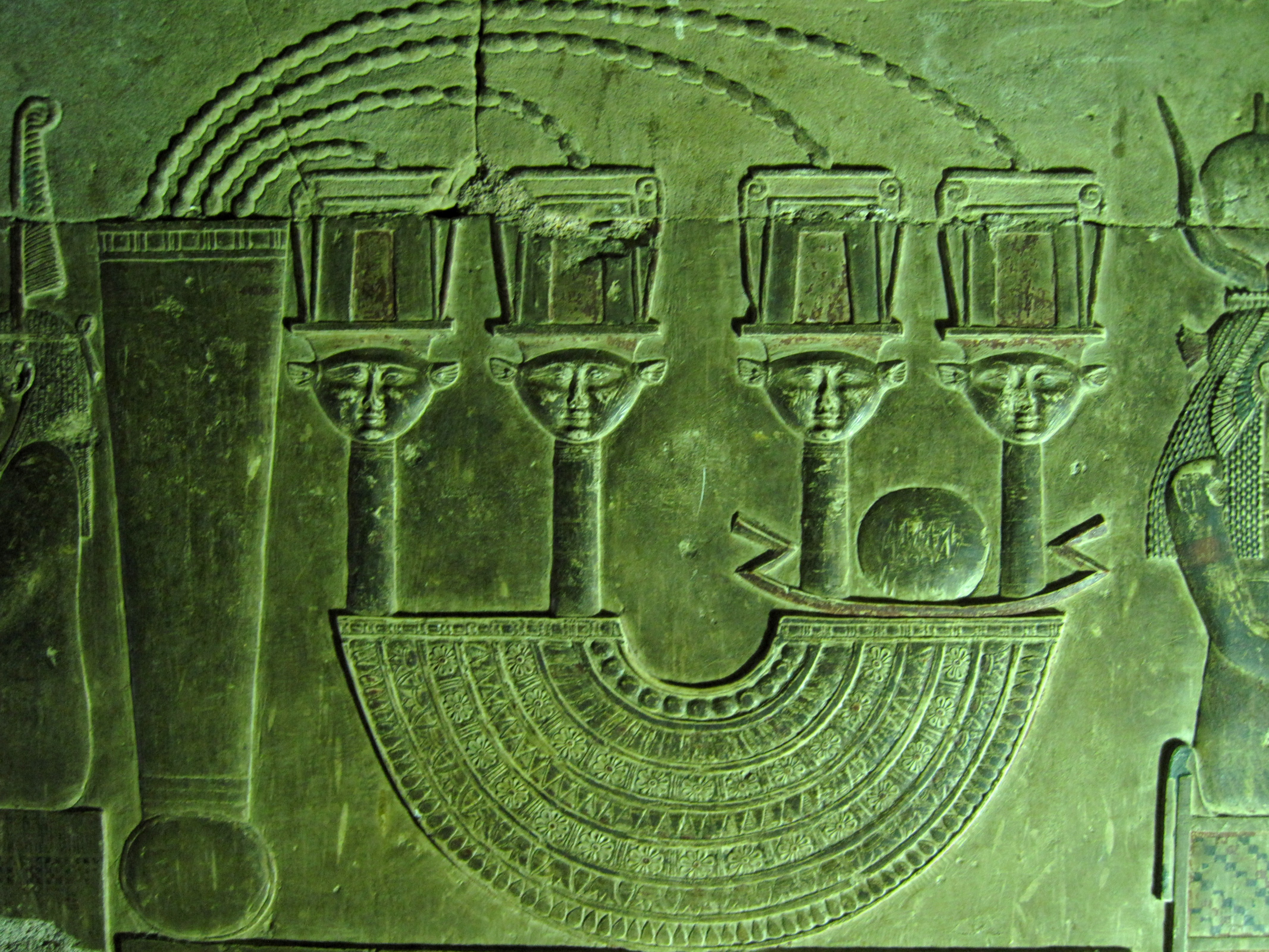
An elaborate menat necklace depicted in a relief at the Temple of Hathor at Dendera

In ancient Egyptian religion, a menat (Ancient Egyptian: mnj.t (𓏠𓈖𓇋𓏏𓋧), Arabic: منات) was a necklace closely associated with the goddess Hathor.

== Operation ==
The menat was held in the hand by its counterpoise and used as a rattle by Hathor's priestesses. It was also worn as a protective amulet, particularly by Apis bulls.

== Parts ==
The menat typically included an aegis attached to beaded strings. The other ends of the strings were tied to a counterweight that dangled on the wearer's back. The aegis was often made of faience, but other materials such as leather and bronze were also used. It was often inscribed or bore depictions of deities associated with Hathor.

== Purpose ==
The necklace was meant to ensure good luck and fortune and to protect against evil spirits. It was also worn for protection in the afterlife and is often found buried with the dead, given as a grave gift since Ramesside times. It was expected to foster fruitfulness and good health for women, and for men it signified virility.
