= Index of Egyptian mythology articles =

This page list topics related to the Ancient Egyptian religion.

See Related changes

== Beliefs ==
- Ancient Egyptian afterlife beliefs
- Ancient Egyptian conception of the soul
- Ancient Egyptian creation myths
- Ancient Egyptian philosophy
- Egyptian mythology
- Isfet (Egyptian mythology)
- Maa Kheru
- Maat
- Numbers in Egyptian mythology
- Osiris myth

== Practices ==
- Ancient Egyptian funerary practices
- Ancient Egyptian offering formula
- Canopic jar
- Egyptian pyramids
- Egyptian temple
- Mortuary temple
- Opening of the mouth ceremony
- The Ritual of Embalming Papyrus
- Veneration of the dead

== Deities ==
- Aani
- Aati
- Abtu
- Ahmose-Nefertari
- Aker (deity)
- Akhty (deity)
- Am-heh
- Amenhotep, son of Hapu
- Amesemi
- Ammit
- Amu-Aa
- Amun
- Amunet
- Anat
- Andjety
- Anput
- Anubis
- Anuket
- Apedemak
- Apesh
- Apis (deity)
- Apophis
- Aqen
- Arensnuphis
- Ash (deity)
- Astarte
- Aten
- Atum
- Ba-Pef
- Baal
- Baalat Gebal
- Babi (mythology)
- Banebdjedet
- Bastet
- Bat (goddess)
- Bata (god)
- Bennu
- Bes
- Buchis
- Celestial Ferryman
- Dedun
- Dionysus-Osiris
- Duau (god)
- Geb
- Gengen-Wer
- Ha (mythology)
- Hapi (Nile god)
- Harmachis
- Harpocrates
- Harsomtus
- Hathor
- Hatmehit
- Hauron
- Hedetet
- Hedjhotep
- Heh (god)
- Heka (god)
- Hemen
- Henet
- Heqaib
- Heqet
- Hermanubis
- Hermes Trismegistus
- Heryshaf
- Hery-maat
- Hesat
- Horus
- Hu (mythology)
- Iabet
- Iah
- Iat
- Igai (deity)
- Ihy
- Imentet
- Imhotep
- Inanna
- Ipy (goddess)
- Irer
- Isis
- Iunit
- Iunmutef
- Iusaaset
- Kebechet
- Kek (mythology)
- Khensit
- Khenti-Amentiu
- Khenti-kheti
- Khepri
- Khereduankh
- Kherty
- Khnum
- Khonsu
- Kneph
- Kolanthes
- Kothar-wa-Khasis
- Maahes
- Maat
- Mafdet
- Mandulis
- Medjed
- Mehen
- Mehet-Weret
- Mehit
- Menhit
- Meret
- Meretseger
- Meskhenet
- Min (god)
- Mnevis
- Montu
- Mut
- Nebethetepet
- Nebtuwi
- Nebnerou
- Nefertem
- Nehebkau
- Nehmetawy
- Neith
- Nekhbet
- Nemty
- Neper (mythology)
- Nephthys
- Nun (mythology)
- Nut (goddess)
- Onuris
- Osiris
- Pakhet
- Panebtawy
- Perit (goddess)
- Petbe
- Peteese and Pihor
- Ptah
- Ptah-Patek
- Qebui
- Qed-her
- Qetesh
- Ra
- Raet-Tawy
- Rekhyt
- Rem (mythology)
- Renenutet
- Renpet
- Renpetneferet
- Repyt
- Resheph
- Ruty
- Sah (god)
- Satis (goddess)
- Sebiumeker
- Sedjem
- Sokar
- Sekhmet
- Sepa (god)
- Serapis
- Serket
- Seshat
- Set (deity)
- Shai
- Shed (deity)
- Shemanefer
- Shepsy
- Shesmetet
- Shezmu
- Shu (god)
- Sia (god)
- Sobek
- Sopdet
- Sopdu
- Ta-Bitjet
- Tatenen
- Taweret
- Tayt
- Tefnut
- Teka-her
- Thoth
- Tjenenyet
- Tutu (Egyptian god)
- Unut
- Wadj-wer
- Wadjet
- Weneg (deity)
- Wepset
- Wepwawet
- Werethekau
- Wosret
- Yam (god)

== Groups of deities ==
- Assessors of Maat
- Cavern deities of the underworld
- Ennead
- Four sons of Horus
- Gate deities of the underworld
- Hemsut
- Ikhemu-sek
- Ogdoad (Egyptian)
- Souls of Pe and Nekhen
- Theban Triad

== Mythical creatures ==
- Abtu
- Akhekh
- Apshait
- Griffin
- Hieracosphinx
- Medjed (fish)
- Serpopard
- Set animal
- Sphinx
- Uraeus

== Characters ==
- Djadjaemankh
- Djedi
- Rededjet
- Ubaoner

== Locations ==
- Aaru
- Akhet (hieroglyph)
- Benben
- Duat
- Land of Manu
- The Indestructibles

== Symbols and objects ==
- Ankh
- Anra scarab
- Atef
- Cartouche
- Corn mummy
- Cowroid
- Crook and flail
- Crown of justification
- Deshret
- Djed
- Egyptian obelisk
- Egyptian pool
- Eye of Horus
- Eye of Ra
- Hedjet
- Hemhem crown
- Hennu
- Horus on the Crocodiles
- Hypocephalus
- Imiut fetish
- Khepresh
- Kneph
- Menat
- Modius (headdress)
- Nebu
- Nemes
- Neshmet
- Ouroboros
- Pschent
- Scarab (artifact)
- Seqtet boat
- Serekh
- Shen ring
- Solar barque
- Tyet
- Ushabti
- Vulture crown
- Was-sceptre
- Winged sun

== Writings ==
- Amduat
- Book of Caverns
- Book of Gates
- Book of Traversing Eternity
- Book of the Dead
- Book of the Earth
- Book of the Heavenly Cow
- Books of Breathing
- Coffin Texts
- Enigmatic Book of the Netherworld
- Festival Songs of Isis and Nephthys
- Great Hymn to the Aten
- Litany of Re
- Litany of the Eye of Horus
- Pyramid Texts
- Spell of the Twelve Caves
- The Contendings of Horus and Seth

== Festivals ==
- Beautiful Festival of the Valley
- Cattle count
- Coronation of the pharaoh
- Min festival
- Mysteries of Osiris
- Opet Festival
- Sed festival

== Related religions ==
- Atenism
- Church of the Most High Goddess
- Gnosticism
- Hermeticism
- Kemetic Orthodoxy
- Kemetism
- Mysteries of Isis
- Temple of Set
- Thelema

== See also ==
- Ancient Egyptian deities
- List of Egyptian deities
- Numbers in Egyptian mythology
