= List of Egyptian deities =

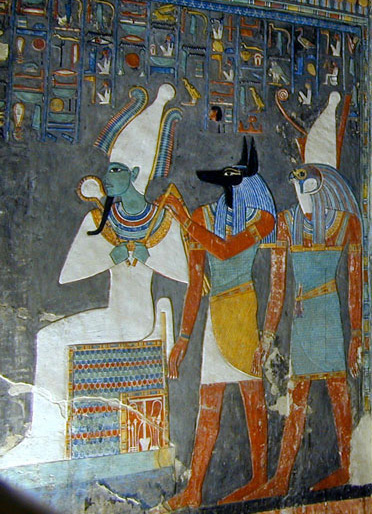
The gods Osiris, Anubis, and Horus in the Tomb of Horemheb (KV57) in the Valley of the Kings.

Ancient Egyptian deities were an integral part of ancient Egyptian religion and were worshiped for millennia. Many of them ruled over natural and social phenomena, as well as abstract concepts. These gods and goddesses appear in virtually every aspect of ancient Egyptian civilization, and more than 1,500 of them are known by name. Many Egyptian texts mention deities' names without indicating their character or role, while other texts refer to specific deities without even stating their name, so a complete list of them is difficult to assemble. This list does not include any Pharaohs who were usually deified, some within their own lifetime, nor does it include the spouses of the Ptolemaic rulers who were also usually deified. The only deified people on this list are the ones in which their deification was unique and uncommon for someone of their status.

== Major deities ==
=== Gods ===
- Aker – A god of Earth and the horizon
- Amun – A creator god, Tutelary deity of the city of Thebes, and the preeminent deity in ancient Egypt during the New Kingdom
- Anubis – The god of funerals, embalming and protector of the dead
- Apis – A live Bull worshiped as a god at Memphis and seen as a manifestation of Ptah
- Aten – Sun disk deity who became the focus of the monolatrous or monotheistic Atenist belief system in the reign of Akhenaten, was also the literal Sun disk
- Atum – A creator god and solar deity, first god of the Ennead
- Bennu – A solar and creator deity, depicted as a Heron
- Bes – Apotropaic god, represented as a dwarf, particularly important in protecting children and women in childbirth
- Geb – An earth god and member of the Ennead
- Heru-ur – An elder form of Horus
- Horus – A kingship god, usually shown as a Falcon or as a human child, linked with the sky, the Sun, kingship, protection, and healing; often said to be the son of Osiris and Isis
- Imhotep – Architect and Vizier to Djoser, eventually deified as a healer god
- Khepri – A solar creator god, often treated as the morning aspect of Ra and represented by a scarab beetle
- Khnum – A Ram god, the Tutelary deity of Elephantine, who was said to control the Nile flood and give life to gods and humans
- Khonsu – A Moon god, son of Amun and Mut
- Maahes – A Lion god, son of Bastet
- Montu – A god of war and the Sun, worshiped at Thebes
- Min – A god of virility, as well as the cities of Akhmim and Qift and the Eastern Desert beyond them
- Nefertem – A god of the lotus blossom from which the sun god rose at the beginning of time. Son of Ptah and Sekhmet
- Onuris – A god of war and hunting
- Osiris – A god of death and resurrection who rules Duat and enlivens vegetation, the sun god, and deceased souls
- Ptah – A creator deity and god of craftsmen, the Tutelary deity of Memphis
- Ra – The foremost Egyptian sun god, involved in creation and the afterlife Mythological ruler of the gods, father of every Egyptian Pharaoh, and the Tutelary deity of Heliopolis
- Set – An ambivalent god, characterized by violence, chaos, and strength, connected with the desert. Mythological murderer of Osiris and enemy of Horus, but also a supporter of the Pharaoh
- Shu – Embodiment of wind or air, a member of the Ennead
- Sobek – A Crocodile god, worshiped in the Faiyum and at Kom Ombo
- Thoth – A knowledge god, and a god of writing and scribes, and Tutelary deity of Hermopolis

=== Goddesses ===
- Amunet – Female counterpart of Amun and a member of the Ogdoad
- Anput – The goddess of funerals, embalming, and protector of the dead, female counterpart to Anubis
- Anuket – A feathered headdress-wearing goddess of Egypt's southern frontier regions, particularly the lower cataracts of the Nile
- Bastet – Goddess represented as a cat or lioness, tutelary deity of the city of Bubastis, linked with protection from evil
- Bat – A cow goddess from early in Egyptian history, eventually absorbed by Hathor
- Hathor – One of the most important goddesses, linked with the sky, the Sun, sexuality and motherhood, music and dance, foreign lands and goods, and the afterlife. One of many forms of the Eye of Ra, she is often depicted as a cow
- Heqet – A frog goddess said to protect women in childbirth
- Hesat – A maternal cow goddess
- Imentet – An afterlife goddess closely linked with Isis and Hathor
- Isis – Wife of Osiris and mother of Horus, linked with funerary rites, motherhood, protection, and magic. She became a deity in Greek and Roman religion
- Maat – A goddess who personified truth, justice, and order
- Menhit – A solar lioness goddess who personified the brow of Ra
- Mut – Consort of Amun, worshiped at Thebes
- Neith – A creator and hunter goddess, tutelary deity of the city of Sais in Lower Egypt
- Nekhbet – A vulture goddess, the tutelary deity of Upper Egypt
- Nephthys – A member of the Ennead; the consort of Set who mourned Osiris alongside Isis
- Nut – A sky goddess, a member of the Ennead
- Pakhet – A lioness goddess mainly worshiped in the area around Beni Hasan
- Renenutet – An agricultural goddess
- Satis – A goddess of Egypt's southern frontier regions
- Sekhmet – A lioness goddess, both destructive and violent and capable of warding off disease, protector of the Pharaohs who led them in war, the consort of Ptah and one of many forms of the Eye of Ra
- Serket – A scorpion goddess, invoked for healing and protection
- Taweret – Hippopotamus goddess, protector of women in childbirth
- Tefnut – A lioness goddess of moisture and a member of the Ennead
- Wadjet – A cobra goddess, the tutelary deity of Lower Egypt
- Wosret – A goddess of Thebes

=== Male and Female forms or Dualsex ===
- Hapi – Personification of the Nile flood
- Heh and Hauhet – Personifications of infinity and members of the Ogdoad
- Kek and Kauket – The god and goddess of Chaos and Darkness, as well as being the concept of primordial darkness
- Neper and Nepit – A god and goddess of Grain
- Nun and Naunet – Personifications of the formless, watery disorder from which the world emerged at creation and members of the Ogdoad
- Tatenen – Personification of the first mound of earth to emerge from chaos in ancient Egyptian creation myths

== Minor deities ==
=== Gods ===
- Aa – A creator god, member of the Shebtiu
- Aani – A protector Ape headed god
- Aati – One of the Assessors of Maat
- Abtu – A fish god that swam in front of Ra's solar barque
- Abu – An early Egyptian god of Light that was likely worshiped in the city of Elephantine
- Aby – A god in Duat
- Akhty – A horizon god depicted as a Northern bald ibis
- Am-heh – A dangerous Duat god
- Amenhotep, son of Hapu – A scribe and architect in the court of Amenhotep III, later deified for his wisdom
- Amu-Aa – A god who accompanies Osiris during the second hour of the night
- An-a-f – One of the Assessors of Maat
- An-hetep-f – One of the Assessors of Maat
- Andjety – A god of the ninth nome of Upper Egypt
- Ani – A god of festivals
- Apedemak – A warlike Lion god from Nubia who appears in some Egyptian-built temples in Lower Nubia
- Apesh – An evil Turtle god
- Apophis – A Serpent deity who personified malevolent chaos and was said to fight Ra in Duat every night
- Aqen – A deity in Duat
- Arensnuphis – A Nubian deity who appears in Egyptian temples in Lower Nubia in the Greco-Roman era
- Ash – A god of the Libyan Desert and oases west of Egypt
- Astennu – A Baboon god associated with Thoth
- Ba – A god of fertility
- Baal – Sky and storm god from Syria and Canaan, worshiped in ancient Egypt during the New Kingdom
- Babi – A Baboon god characterized by sexuality and aggression
- Banebdjedet – A Ram god, Tutelary deity of the city of Mendes
- Ba-Pef – A little-known Duat deity; Ram-headed god of the eighth hour
- Bata – A Bull god, the brother of Anubis
- Buchis – A live Bull god worshiped in the region around Thebes and a manifestation of Montu
- Dedun – A Nubian god, said to provide the Ancient Egyptians with incense and other resources that came from Nubia
- Denwen – A Serpent and dragon god
- Djebuty – Tutelary deity of Edfu
- Djedefhor – Son of the Pharaoh Khufu credited with writing an important Wisdom Text who may have been deified after his death, though this is disputed
- Djefa – God of abundance
- Dionysus-Osiris – A Greco-Egyptian life-death-rebirth god who was a syncretism from Dionysus and Osiris
- Duamutef – A son of Horus
- Dunanwi – A falcon god worshiped in the Eighteenth Nome of upper Egypt
- Duau – A Moon god
- Fa – A god of destiny
- Fetket – A butler of Ra
- Gengen-Wer – A celestial Goose god who guarded the celestial egg containing the life force
- Ha – A god of the Libyan Desert and oases west of Egypt
- Hapi-Wet – God of the Nile in heaven
- Hapy – A son of Horus
- Har-em-akhet – Sphinx god, form of Horus
- Harpocrates – A form of Horus depicted as a child that developed in and was worshiped in Ptolemaic Egypt
- Harsomtus – A child god of Edfu
- Hauron – A protector and healing god, originally a Canaanite god
- Heka – Personification of magic
- Hemen – A Falcon god
- Heneb – A god of grain
- Henkhisesui – God of the east winds
- Heqaib – Nomarch of the first nome of Upper Egypt, deified after his death because of his military skill
- Hermanubis – A Greco-Egyptian god who was a syncretism from Hermes and Anubis
- Hermes Trismegistus – A Greco-Egyptian god and legendary author of the Hermetica who was a syncretism from Hermes and Thoth
- Heru-Khu – A god in the fifth division of Duat
- Hery-Maat – A funerary deity depicted as a seated naked man
- Hery-sha-duat – A Duat god in charge of the fields of Duat
- Heryshaf – Ram god worshiped at Heracleopolis Magna
- Hez-Ur – A little-known Baboon god
- Hraf-haf – A ferryman for the dead and one of the Assessors of Maat
- Hu – Personification of the authority of the spoken word
- Hutchai – The god of the west winds
- Iah – A Moon god
- Igai – God of oases and Egypt's Western Desert
- Ihy – A child deity born to Horus and Hathor, representing the music and joy produced by the sistrum
- Imsety – A son of Horus
- Irer – Personification of sight
- Iunmutef – A form of Horus depicted as a priest with a Leopard skin over the torso
- Izi – Nomarch of the second nome of Upper Egypt who may have been deified after his death
- Jupiter Ammon – A Roman-influenced god who was syncretism from Jupiter and Amun worshiped at the Siwa Oasis in Egypt
- Kagemni I – Vizier credited with writing an important Wisdom Text who may have been deified after his death
- Kemwer – A bull god
- Khenti-Amentiu – A necropolis deity
- Khenti-kheti – Crocodile or Falcon god worshiped at Athribis
- Kherty – A Duat god, usually depicted as a ram
- Khesfu – A god who carries a spear in the tenth division of Duat
- Kneph – A Ram creator god
- Kolanthes – A child god, son of Min, and Repyt
- Kothar-wa-Khasis – A Ugaritic god rarely mentioned in Egyptian literature
- Maga – A Crocodile god
- Mandulis – A Lower Nubian Sun deity who appeared in some Egyptian temples
- Mau – A cat god and form of Ra
- Medjed – A god from the Book of the Dead
- Mehen – A Serpent god who protects the barque of Ra as it travels through Duat
- Mnevis – A live Bull god worshiped at Heliopolis as a manifestation of Ra
- Nebnerou – A lion-headed deity with knives
- Nefer Hor – A son of Thoth and form of Horus
- Neferhotep – A son of Hathor worshiped in Hu
- Nehebkau – A protective serpent god
- Nekheny – A predynastic Falcon god
- Nemty – Falcon god, worshiped in Middle Egypt, who appears in myth as a ferryman for greater gods
- Panebtawy – A child god, son of Heru-ur
- Petbe – God of revenge
- Peteese – Brother of Pihor who drowned in the Nile, later deified
- Pihor – Brother of Peteese who drowned in the Nile, later deified
- Ptahhotep – Vizier credited with writing an important Wisdom Text who may have been deified after his death though this is disputed
- Ptah-Patek – A dwarf protector god
- Qebehsenuef – A son of Horus
- Qebui – God of the north winds
- Ra-Horakhty – A form of Ra in which he is joined with Horus
- Rekhyt – A Sun god associated with lapwings that originated as a name for a people
- Rem – Fish god and the personification of Ra's tears
- Resheph – A Syrian war god adopted into Ancient Egyptian religion in the New Kingdom, depicted with beard and the crown of Upper Egypt
- Ruty – A god depicted as a pair of Lions who represents the horizon and guard Ra's solar barque
- Sah – Personification of the constellation Orion
- Sahekek – A god that was blamed for causing headaches
- Sebeg – Personification of the planet Mercury
- Sebiumeker – Guardian god of procreation and fertility, he was a major god in Meroë, Nubia
- Sed – A Jackal deity who protected kingship
- Sedjem – Personification of hearing
- Sekhemus – A god in the fourth hour of Duat
- Sepa – A centipede god who protected people from snake bites
- Sepes – A god who lived in a tree
- Septu – A bearded, plume-wearing god
- Serapis – A Greco-Egyptian god from the Ptolemaic Period who fused traits of Osiris and Apis with those of several Greek gods husband of Isis who, like her, was adopted into Greek and Roman religion outside Egypt
- Seta-Ta – A mummified god in the fourth division of Duat
- Setcheh – A serpent demon
- Setem – A god of healing
- Shed – A god believed to save people from danger and misfortune
- Shemanefer – A crocodile God worshiped at Esna
- Shehbui – God of the south winds
- Shepsy – Local sun god in Hermopolis
- Shezmu – A god of wine, blood, and oil presses who also slaughters condemned souls
- Sia – Personification of perception
- Sokar – God of the Memphite Necropolis and of the afterlife in general
- Sopdu – A god of the sky and of Egypt's eastern border regions
- Teka-her – A serpent god in the fourth hour of Duat
- Tenem – A creator god, husband of Tenemu
- Tutu – An apotropaic god from the Greco-Roman era
- Wai – A creator god, member of the Shebtiu
- Wadj-wer – Personification of the Mediterranean Sea or lakes of the Nile Delta
- Weneg – A plant god and son of Ra who maintains cosmic order
- Wenenu – A protector god
- Wenty – A crocodile god
- Wepwawet – A jackal god, the tutelary deity of Asyut, connected with warfare and the afterlife
- Yam – A Syrian god of the sea who appears in some Ancient Egyptian literature

=== Goddesses ===
- Abaset – A hedgehog goddess
- Ahmose-Nefertari – The mother of Amenhotep I, deified
- Ahti – A malevolent hippopotamus goddess
- Amathaunta – An ocean goddess
- Amesemi – A Nubian moon goddess
- Ammit – Goddess who devoured condemned souls
- Amn – A goddess who welcomed souls of the dead in Duat
- Anat – A war and fertility goddess, originally from Syria, who entered ancient Egyptian religion in the Middle Kingdom A daughter of Re, thus, in Egypt, a sister of Astarte
- Anet – A fish goddess that swam in front of Ra's solar barque
- Anhefta – A protective spirit who guards one end of the ninth division of Duat
- Anit – Wife of Andjety
- Anuke – A war goddess
- Aperet-Isis – One of the wives of Min
- Astarte – A warrior goddess from Syria and Canaan who entered ancient Egyptian religion in the New Kingdom
- Ay – A goddess who embodies the raging aspect of the returning goddess
- Baalat Gebal – A Canaanite goddess, tutelary deity of the city of Byblos, adopted into ancient Egyptian religion
- Bairthy – A water goddess
- Beset – Guardian of women in childbirth and infants who appeared during the Middle Kingdom, the female counterpart and possibly the mother of Bes
- Besna – Goddess of home security
- Esna – A divine perch
- Hatmehit – Fish goddess worshiped at Mendes
- Hedetet – A scorpion goddess
- Heptet – A knife-holding goddess of death
- Henet – A pelican goddess
- Heret-Kau – A protector goddess who protected the souls of the dead in the afterlife
- Hert-ketit-s – A lioness-headed goddess in the eleventh division of Duat
- Hert-Nemmat-Set – A goddess in the eleventh division of Duat who punishes the damned
- Hert-sefu-s – A goddess in the eleventh division of Duat
- Heru-pa-kaut – A mother goddess with a fish on her head
- Heset – Goddess of food and drink
- Hetepes-Sekhus – A personification of the eye of Ra, also a cobra goddess
- Iabet – Goddess of fertility and rebirth
- Iaret – Goddess that represented the Uraeus
- Iat – A goddess of milk and nursing
- Ipy – A mother goddess depicted as a hippopotamus
- Ishtar – The East Semitic version of Astarte, occasionally mentioned in ancient Egyptian literature
- Iunit – A wife of Montu
- Iusaaset – A female counterpart to Atum; a goddess worshiped at Heliopolis
- Iw – A creation goddess
- Kebechet – Daughter of Anubis, goddess of freshness, she helps him in mummifying dead bodies
- Ken – Goddess of love
- Khefthernebes – A funerary deity
- Khensit – A goddess from the twentieth nome of Lower Egypt
- Khereduankh – Divine mother of Imhotep
- Mafdet – A predatory goddess said to destroy dangerous creatures
- Matit – A funerary cat goddess who had a cult center at Thinis
- Mehet-Weret – A celestial cow goddess
- Mehit – A warrior lioness goddess originally from Nubia worshiped at Abydos, consort of Onuris
- Meretseger – A cobra goddess who oversaw the Theban Necropolis
- Meret – The goddess of music who established cosmic order
- Meskhenet – A goddess who presided over childbirth
- Nakith – A goddess in Duat
- Nebethetepet – A female counterpart to Atum
- Nebtuwi – A fertility goddess
- Nehbet-Anet – A goddess who is raped by Geb in the Tebtunis manual
- Nehmetawy – A goddess, the consort of Nehebkau or Thoth
- Pelican – Goddess of the dead
- Perit – A goddess in Duat
- Pesi – A goddess in Duat
- Qerhet – Goddess of the eighth nome of Lower Egypt
- Qed-her – Gate goddess in Duat
- Qetesh – A goddess of sexuality and sacred ecstasy from Syria and Canaan, adopted into ancient Egyptian religion in the New Kingdom
- Raet-Tawy – A female counterpart to Ra
- Rekhit – A goddess in Duat
- Renpet – Goddess who personified the year
- Renpetneferet – Divine wife of Imhotep
- Repyt – A wife of Min
- Reret – A protector hippopotamus goddess
- Sait – A goddess in Duat
- Sehith – A goddess in Duat
- Sekhat-Hor – A cow goddess
- Sekhet-Metu – A goddess in Duat
- Seret – A lioness goddess possibly originally from Libya
- Sesenet-Khu – A goddess in Duat
- Seshat – Goddess of writing and record-keeping, depicted as a scribe
- Shemat-Khu – A goddess in Duat
- Shentayet – A protective goddess, possibly of widows
- Shenty – A cow goddess
- Shepet – A hippopotamus Goddess
- Shesmetet – A lioness goddess
- Sopdet – Personification of the star Sirius, mother of Sopdu
- Swenet – Goddess related to Aswan
- Ta-Bitjet – A scorpion goddess
- Tafner – A vulture headdress-wearing goddess
- Tasenetnofret – A wife of Heru-ur
- Tayt – Goddess of weaving
- Temet – A female counterpart to Atum
- Temtith – A goddess in Duat
- Tenemu – A creator goddess, wife of Tenem
- Tetrads – Goddess of completeness
- Tjenenyet – A goddess of brewing and protection
- Themath – A goddess in Duat
- Thermuthis – Goddess of fate, fertility, and harvest
- Thmei – Goddess of truth
- Unut – A goddess represented as a serpent or a hare, worshiped in the region of Hermopolis
- Usit – A goddess in Duat
- Wepset – A protector serpent goddess
- Werethekau – A goddess who protected the Pharaoh

=== Male and Female forms or Dualsex ===
- Gereh and Gerehet – The god and goddess of Night, sometimes replaced Amun and Amunet in the Ogdoad
- Hedjhotep – God of fabrics and clothing
- Nia and Niat – The god and goddess of the void, sometimes replaced Amun and Amunet in the Ogdoad
- Shai – Personification of fate

== Lesser-known deities ==
=== Gods ===
- Aakhu – A Ram headed god
- Aakhu-hetch-t – A god of the dead
- Aakhu-ra – A singing god of dawn
- Aakhu-sa-ta-f – A warrior god
- Aakhui – A god with two lotus scepters
- Ami-beq – A god of the dead
- Ami-haf – A god who has a harpoon
- Ami-He-t-Serqet-Ka-hetep-t – A god
- Ami-kar – A singing Ape god
- Ami-kehau – A god
- Ami-naut-f – A Serpent god
- Ami-neht-f – A god
- Ami-neter – A singing god
- Ami-Nu – A sky god
- Ami-Pe – A Lion god
- Ami-ret – A god
- Ami-sehseh – A god
- Ami-sekhet-f – A god of his domain
- Ami-sepa-f – A god
- Ami-suht-f – A god of the ninth Aat
- Ami-ta – A Serpent god
- Ami-ut – God of the ninth day of the month
- An-mut-f – A god
- An-tcher-f – A god
- Anmut-fabesh – A star god
- Antywy – A god of the tenth nome of Upper Egypt god of the sixth hour of night
- Ari – The creative god
- Ari-em-aua – God of the sixth hour of night
- Ari-en-ab-f – A blue eyed god
- Ari-hetch-f – A light god
- Ari-ren-f-tehesef – God of the tenth day of the month
- Ari-tchet-f – A god of the ninth day of the month
- Ari-Amen – A god
- Athpi – A god of dawn
- Baty – A Mummified Ram god
- Ba-aakhu-ha-f – A Ram headed god
- Ba-em-uar-ur – A god
- Ba-Ra – A god
- Ba-ta – An Ape god
- Ba-tau – A god worshiped at Cynopolis
- Ba-utcha-hau-f – A Ram-headed god
- Dua – A god
- Heb – A god
- Hun-sahu – A god
- Iaaw – Father of Ha
- Khenti-en-Sa-t – A star god
- Khenti-heh-f – A knife-eyed god who guarded the tomb of Osiris
- Khenti-henthau – A god
- Khenti-Het Anes – A god
- Khenti-kha-t-anes – A knife-eyed god who guarded Osiris
- Khenti-Khas – A god who protected noses of the dead
- Khenti-qerer – A god
- Kis – A god worshiped at Cusae
- Maa-ab-khenti-ah-t-f – A god
- Maa-atht-f – A god of the fourteenth Aat
- Maa-en-Ra – An Ape doorkeeper god
- Maa-f-ur – A god
- Maa-ha-f – A ferry god
- Maa-mer-f – God of the twenty-sixth day of the month
- Men-t – A god
- Meni – A god
- Menu – A god of the fifth month
- Menu-nesu-Heru – A warrior Bull god
- Menu-qet – God of the first Aat
- Met-en-Asar – A Serpent god
- Met-her – A god of the dead
- Metes – A doorkeeper god
- Metes-ab – An Ibis headed god
- Metes-neshen – A god
- Meti – A Hawk headed god
- Metni – A Hippopotamus god of evil
- Metu-ta-f – A god
- Neb – A Goose god, also a watcher of Osiris
- Neb aa – A singing god of dawn
- Neb amakh – A god who towed the boat of Af
- Neb ankh – A singing god of dawn
- Neb aq-t – A Jackal god
- Neb Kheper-Khenti-Tuat – A Maat god
- Neb Khert-ta – A star god
- Neb pat – A god
- Neb seb-t – A god
- Neb Uast – A god of the boat of Pakhet
- Neb-Un – A god
- Neb user – A Ram-headed god
- Neb utchat-ti – A Serpent god with human legs
- Nebti – A god
- Nekenher – A frightening god
- Neter – A Serpent god
- Neterti – A god in Duat
- Neter bah – A god
- Neter neferu – A god
- Neter-hau – Nile god
- Neter-ka-qetqet – A god who guarded Osiris
- Neter-kha – God of one thousand years
- Netrit-ta-meh – An axe god
- Netrit-Then – An axe god
- Ra-ateni – A god
- Sak – A Crocodile god
- Sed-teda-nebareq-pet – A hippopotamus god. Part of ikhemu-sek
- Unnti – The god of existence
- Unta – A light god
- Up – An Ape god
- Up-hai – God of the dead
- Up-shat-taui – A god
- Up-uatu – A singing god
- Upi-sekhemti – A Jackal-headed singing god
- Upt-heka – Enchantment god
- Upast – A light god
- Upu – God of the Serpent Shemti
- Ur – A god
- Ur-ares – A god of a boat
- Ur-at – A god of Kher-Aha
- Ur-heka – A god of Dendera
- Ur-henhenu – A water god
- Ur-henu – A water god
- Ur-khert – A Jackal god in the second Aat
- Ur-maati-f – A god
- Ur-metuu-her-aat-f – A god
- Ur-pehti – A doorkeeper god
- Ur-pehui-f – A god
- Urrta – A god

=== Goddesses ===
- Ami-khent-aat – A goddess of Edfu
- Ami-pet-seshem-neterit – One of the twelve Thoueris goddesses
- Ami-urt – A cow goddess
- Ami-utchat-saakhu-Atemt – One of the twelve Thoueris goddesses
- Amit-Qetem – A goddess who assisted resurrecting Osiris
- Amit-she-t-urt – A goddess
- Apertra – A singing goddess
- Arit-aakhu – A star goddess
- Ariti – A goddess
- Ba-khati – A goddess
- Baiut-s-amiu-heh – A goddess
- Hebit – An air goddess
- Hunit – Goddess of the twenty first day of the month
- Hunit Pe – A Tutelary deity of Buto
- Hunit urit – A Tutelary deity of Heliopolis
- Huntheth – A Lioness goddess
- Hurit urit – A goddess
- Maa-a – A singing god
- Maa-neter-s – A singing goddess
- Neb aau – A goddess
- Neb Aa-t – A goddess
- Neb Aa-t-Then – A goddess
- Neb-abui – A goddess
- Neb akeb – A goddess
- Neb Anit – A goddess
- Neb ari-t-qerr-t – A goddess
- Neb arit-tchetflu – Goddess who created reptiles
- Neb as-hatt – A goddess
- Neb as-ur – A goddess
- Neb Ater – A goddess
- Neb ater-Shema – A goddess
- Neb aur – A goddess of the river
- Neb Aut – A goddess
- Neb Baa-t – A goddess
- Neb hekau – The goddess of spells
- Neb hetep – A Crocodile goddess
- Neb Khasa – A goddess
- Neb Khebit – The goddess of Chemmis
- Neb pehti – A goddess
- Neb Per-res – A goddess
- Neb petti – A goddess
- Neb Sa – A goddess
- Neb Sam – A goddess
- Neb sau-ta – A goddess
- Neb sebu – A goddess
- Neb Septi – A goddess
- Neb-t aakhu – A Serpent goddess of dawn
- Neb-t anemit – A goddess of offerings
- Neb-t ankh – One of twelve goddesses who opened the gates of Duat to Af
- Neb-t ankhiu – A goddess with two serpents
- Neb-t Atu – A goddess
- Nebt-Au-Khenti-Tuat – A cow goddess who appears in the ninth hour of Ra's journey through Duat in the Book of Gates
- Neb-t au-t-ab – A cow goddess
- Neb-t Kheper – A Serpent goddess
- Neb-t-khu – A goddess in Duat
- Neb-t-mat – A goddess in Duat
- Neb-t-setau – A goddess in Duat
- Neb-t-shat – A goddess in Duat
- Neb-t-shefshefet – A goddess in Duat
- Neb-t usha – Goddess of the eighth division of the Duat
- Neb Un – A goddess
- Nebt Annu – A goddess
- Neterit-nekhenit-Ra – A singing goddess in Duat
- Neseret – A uraeus goddess
- Qererti – A goddess
- Un-baiusit – A goddess
- Unnit – A goddess
- Unnuit – A goddess
- Upit – A Serpent goddess
- Ur-a – A goddess
- Urit – A goddess
- Urit-ami-t-Tuat – A goddess who escorted Ra
- Urit-em-sekhemu-s – Goddess of the fourth hour
- Urit-en-kru – A Lioness headed Hippopotamus goddess
- Urit-hekau – Goddess of Upper Egypt
- Urti-hethati – Goddess of Anu

=== Male or female ===
- Neb au-t-ab – A god or goddess in the Duat
- Netrit fent – An axe god or goddess

== Groups of deities ==
- The Aai – Three guardian deities in the ninth division of Duat; they are Ab-ta, Anhefta, and Ermen-ta
- The Assessors of Maat – Forty-two deities, who judged the souls of the dead in the afterlife
- The Cavern deities of the underworld – Many Duat deities charged with punishing the damned souls by beheading and devouring them
- The Ennead – An extended family of nine deities produced by Atum during the creation of the world. The Ennead usually consisted of Atum, his children Shu and Tefnut, their children Geb and Nut, and their children Osiris, Isis, Set, and Nephthys
- The Four sons of Horus – Four gods who protected the mummified body, particularly the internal organs in canopic jars
- The Gate deities of the underworld – Many dangerous guardian deities at the gates of Duat (flanked by divine Doorkeepers and Heralds), to be ingratiated with spells and by knowing their names 31 of these gods, appeared in the book of the dead. Among them are deities such as Qeq-hauau-ent-pehui or “eater of his own filth”, Khesef-At or “repulser of the crocodile” and Ankh-f-em-fent or “ he who lives on worms”.
- The Hemsut – Protective goddesses of Fate, destiny, and of the creation sprung from the primordial abyss; daughters of Ptah, linked to the concept of ka
- The Her-Hequi – Four deities in the fifth division of Duat
- The Horus of the day deities – Twelve divine embodiments of each hour of the day: partly major deities (first: Maat and Nenit, second: Hu and Ra em-nu, third: unknown, fourth: Ashespi-kha, Fifth: Nesbit and Agrit, sixth: Ahait, seventh: Horus and Nekait or Nekai-t, eighth: Khensu and Kheprit, ninth: Neten-her-netch-her and Ast em nebt ankh, tenth: Urit-hekau or Hekau-ur, eleventh: Amanh, and partly lesser-known ones (twelfth: "The One Who Gives Protection In The Twilight")
- The Horus of the night deities – Twelve goddesses of each hour of the night, wearing a five-pointed star on their heads Neb-t tehen and Neb-t heru, god and goddess of the first hour of night, Apis or Hep (in reference) and Sarit-neb-s, god and goddess of the second hour of night, M'k-neb-set, goddess of the third hour of night, Aa-t-shefit or Urit-shefit, goddess of the fourth hour of the night, Heru-heri-uatch-f and Nebt ankh, god and goddess of the Fifth hour of the night, Ari-em-aua or Uba-em-tu-f and Mesperit, neb-t shekta or Neb-t tcheser, god and goddess of the sixth hour of the night, Heru-em-sau-ab and Herit-t-chatcha-ah, god and goddess of the seventh hour of the night, Ba-pefi and Ankh-em-neser-t or Merit-neser-t, god and goddess of the eighth hour of night, An-mut-f and Neb-t sent-t, god and goddess of the ninth hour of the night, Amset or Neb neteru and M'k-neb-set, god and goddess of the tenth hour of night, Uba-em-tu-f and Khesef-khemit or M'kheskhemuit, god and goddess of the eleventh hour, Khepri and Maa-neferut-Ra, god and goddess of the twelfth hour of the night
- The Ikhemu-sek – Group of Ancient Egyptian deities who were the personifications of the northern constellations
- The Khnemiu – Four deities wearing red crowns in the eleventh division of Duat
- The Ogdoad – A set of eight gods who personified the chaos that existed before creation. The Ogdoad commonly consisted of Amun – Amunet, Nun – Naunet, Heh – Hauhet, and Kek – Kauket
- The Renniu – Four bearded gods in the eleventh division of Duat
- The Setheniu-Tep – Four deities wearing white crowns in the eleventh division of Duat
- The Shebtiu – A group of creator gods worshipped at Edfu
- The Souls of Pe and Nekhen – A set of gods personifying the predynastic rulers of Upper and Lower Egypt
- The Theban Triad – Consisted of Amun, his consort Mut and their son Khonsu
- The Twelve Thoueris goddesses – (first:Ami-pet-seshem-neterit, second:Ami-utchat-saakhu-Atemt)

== Works cited ==
- Allen, James P. (2000). Middle Egyptian: An Introduction to the Language and Culture of Hieroglyphs. Cambridge University Press. ISBN 0-521-77483-7.
- Budge, E.A. Wallis (1905). The Egyptian Heaven and Hell. Londres: Kegan Paul, Trench, Trübner & Company.
- Hart, George (2005). The Routledge Dictionary of Egyptian Gods and Goddesses, Second Edition. Routledge. ISBN 0-203-02362-5.
- Holbl, Gunther (2001). A History of the Ptolemaic Empire. London: Routledge.
- Porter, Bertha; Moss, Rosalind (1991). Topographical Bibliography of Ancient Egyptian Hieroglyphic Texts, Reliefs, and Paintings. Griffith Institute, Ashmolean Museum Oxford. ISBN 978-0-900416-82-8.
- Smith, Mark S. (1994). The Ugaritic Baal cycle. Volume I. Introduction with Text, Translations and Commentary of KTU 1.1-1.2. Leiden: Brill. ISBN 978-90-04-09995-1. OCLC 30914624.
- Wilkinson, Richard H. (2003). The Complete Gods and Goddesses of Ancient Egypt. Thames & Hudson. ISBN 0-500-05120-8.
- Lorton, Claude Traunecker. Transl. from the French by David (2001). The gods of Egypt (1st English-language edn, enhanced and expanded). Ithaca, N.Y [u.a.]: Cornell University Press. ISBN 0-8014-3834-9.
- Budge, Sir Ernest A. Wallis (2010). An Egyptian hieroglyphic dictionary (in two volumes, with an index of English words, king list and geographical list with indexes, list of hieroglyphic characters, Coptic and Semitic alphabets). New York: Cosimo Classics. ISBN 978-1-61640-460-4.
- "Aswan History Facts and Timeline: Aswan, Egypt". http://www.world-guides.com/africa/egypt/aswan/aswan_history.html.
- Petry, Alan W. Shorter; with a new bibliography by Bonnie L. (1994). The Egyptian gods : a handbook (rev. edn). San Bernardino (Calif.): The Borgo Press. ISBN 0-89370-535-7.
- "Gods of Egypt". http://www.touregypt.net/godsofegypt/.
- Willockx, Sjef. "Amentet, Andjeti and Anubis: Three Ancient Egyptian Gods (2007)".
- Mark, Joshua J. "Egyptian Gods – The Complete List". https://www.worldhistory.org/article/885/egyptian-gods---the-complete-list/.
- Nelson, Thomas (2017). The Woman's Study Bible: Receiving God's Truth for Balance, Hope, and Transformation. Biblica, Inc.
- "GVC09-24: Mystical creatures and gods -Egyptian".
- Durdin-Robertson, Lawrence (1979). Communion With The Goddess: Idols, Images, and Symbols of the Goddesses; Egypt Part III. Cesara Publications.
- translations, translated by Raymond O. Faulkner; with additional; Wasserman, a commentary by Ogden Goelet JR.; with color illustrations from the facsimile volume produced in 1890 under the supervision of E.A. Wallis Budge; introduced by Carol A. R. Andrews; edited by Eva Von Dassow; in an edition conceived by James (1994). The Egyptian Book of the dead : the Book of going forth by day : being the Papyrus of Ani (royal scribe of the divine offerings), written and illustrated circa 1250 B.C.E., by scribes and artists unknown, including the balance of chapters of the books of the dead known as the theban recension, compiled from ancient texts, dating back to the roots of Egyptian civilization (1st edn). San Francisco: Chronicle Books. ISBN 0-8118-0767-3.
