= Outline of ancient Egypt =

Overview of and topical guide to ancient Egypt

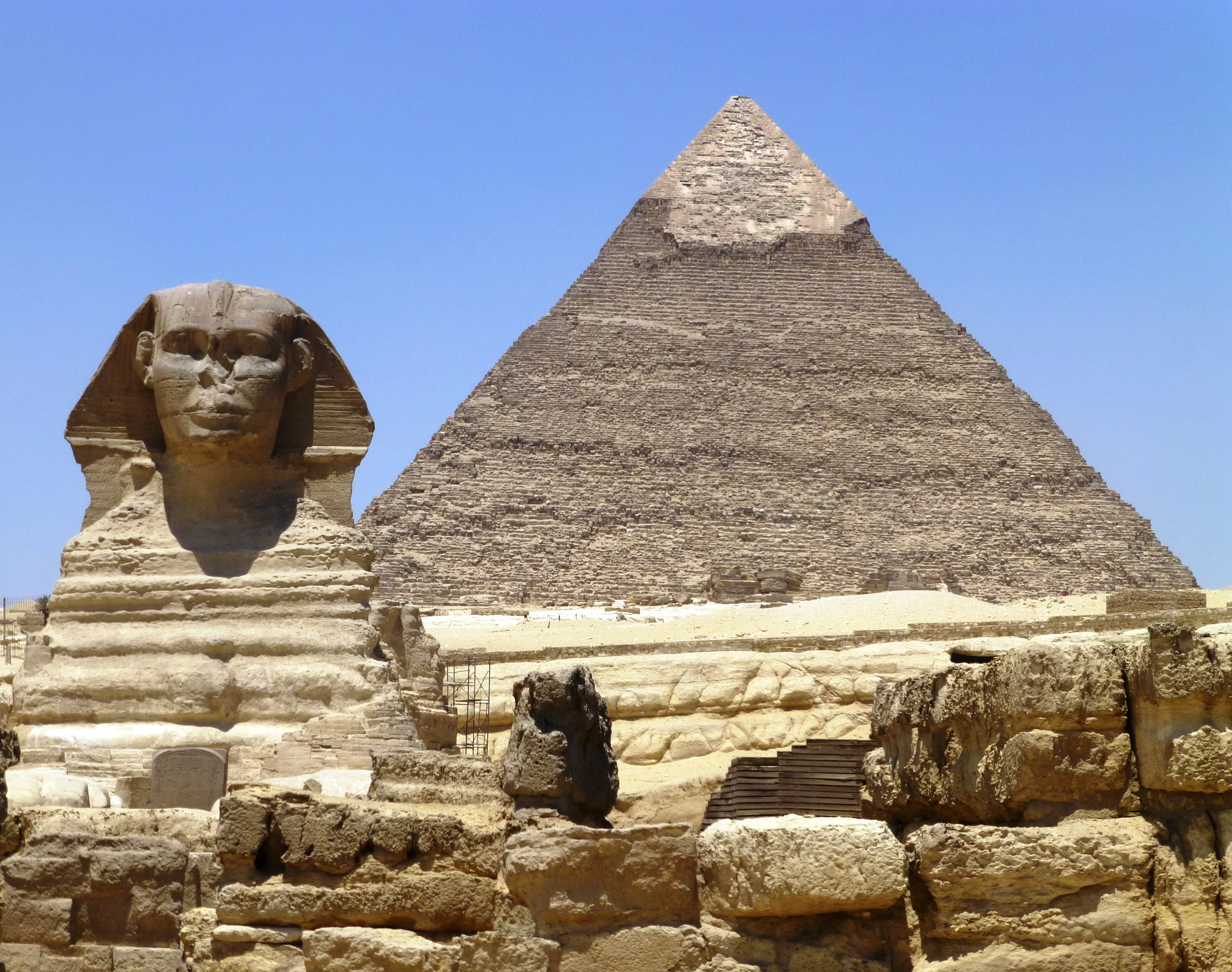
The Great Sphinx of Giza and Khafre Pyramid

The following outline is provided as an overview of a topical guide to ancient Egypt:

Ancient Egypt – ancient civilization of eastern North Africa, concentrated along the lower reaches of the Nile River in what is now the modern country of Egypt. Egyptian civilization coalesced around 3150 BC (according to conventional Egyptian chronology) with the political unification of Upper and Lower Egypt under the first pharaoh.

The many achievements of the ancient Egyptians include the quarrying, surveying and construction techniques that facilitated the building of monumental pyramids, temples, and obelisks; a system of mathematics; a practical and effective system of medicine; irrigation systems and agricultural production techniques; some of the first known ships; Egyptian faience and glass technology; new forms of literature; and the earliest known peace treaty. Its monuments have inspired the imaginations of travelers and writers for centuries.

== What type of thing is Ancient Egypt? ==
Ancient Egypt can be described as:

- an ancient civilization
  - a Bronze Age civilization
- part of ancient history

== Geography of ancient Egypt ==
=== Places ===
- Abu Gorab
- Abu Mena
- Abu Rawash
- Abu Simbel
- Abusir
- Abydos
- Alexandria
- Al Fayyum/Atef-Pehu
- Amarna/Akhetaten
- Aswan
- Asyut
- Avaris
- Beni Hasan
- Bubastis
- Buhen
- Busiris (Lower Egypt)
- Buto
- Clysma
- Cusae
- Dahshur
- Deir el-Bahri
- Deir el-Medina
- Edfu
- El-Lahun
- Elephantine/Abu/Yebu
- Gebel el-Silsila
- Giza
- Hebenu
- Heliopolis/Annu/Iunu
- Herwer
- Hypselis
- Itjtawy
- Kom el-Hisn
- Luxor
- Memphis/Ineb Hedj
- Mendes
- Naucratis
- Pelusium
- Pi-Ramesses
- Rosetta
- Saqqara
- Sais
- Tanis/Djanet
- Thebes/Niwt/Waset
- Thinis

more...

== Government and politics of ancient Egypt ==
=== Pharaohs ===
- Pharaoh – an article about the history of the title "Pharaoh" with descriptions of the regalia, crowns and titles used.
- List of pharaohs – this article contains a list of the pharaohs of Ancient Egypt, from the Early Dynastic Period before 3000 BC through to the end of the Ptolemaic Dynasty
- Coronation of the pharaoh
  - Crowns of Egypt
- Dynasties of Ancient Egypt
- Ancient Egyptian royal titulary

=== Government officials ===
- Vizier (Ancient Egypt) – the vizier was the highest official in Ancient Egypt to serve the king, or pharaoh during the Old, Middle, and New Kingdoms.
- Viceroy of Kush – the Lower Nubian Kush was a province of Egypt from the 16th century BC to eleventh century BC. During this period it was ruled by a viceroy who reported directly to the Egyptian Pharaoh.
- Treasurer (Ancient Egypt) – the treasurer was responsible for products coming to the royal palace. They were the main economical administrator of the royal belongings.

=== Egyptian law ===
Egyptian law

=== Military of ancient Egypt ===
Military of ancient Egypt

- Chariotry in ancient Egypt
- Ancient Egyptian Navy

== General history of ancient Egypt ==
History of ancient Egypt

=== History of ancient Egypt, by period ===
- Prehistoric Egypt – The Prehistory of Egypt spans the period of earliest human settlement to the beginning of the Early Dynastic Period of Egypt in ca. 3100 BC.
  - Naqada I or Amratian culture - a cultural period in the history of predynastic Upper Egypt, which lasted approximately from 4000 to 3500 BC.
  - Naqada II or Gerzeh culture - The Gerzean is the second of three phases of the Naqada Culture, and so is called Naqada II. It begins circa 3500 BC lasting through circa 3200 BC.
  - Naqada III or Semainean culture - Naqada III is the last phase of the Naqadan period of ancient Egyptian prehistory, dating approximately from 3200 to 3100 BC.
- Early Dynastic Period of Egypt – The Archaic or Early Dynastic Period of Egypt immediately follows the unification of Lower and Upper Egypt c. 3100 BC. It is generally taken to include:
  - The First Dynasty of Egypt
  - The Second Dynasty of Egypt
- Old Kingdom of Egypt – The name given to the period in the 3rd millennium BC when Egypt attained its first continuous peak of civilization in complexity and achievement – the first of three so-called "Kingdom" periods, which mark the high points of civilization in the lower Nile Valley. This time period includes:
  - The Third Dynasty of Egypt
  - The Fourth Dynasty of Egypt
  - The Fifth Dynasty of Egypt
  - The Sixth Dynasty of Egypt
- First Intermediate Period of Egypt – This period is often described as a “dark period” in Ancient Egyptian history, spanning approximately 140 years after the end of the Old Kingdom from ca. 2181–2055 BC. It included:
  - The possibly spurious Seventh Dynasty of Egypt
  - The Eighth Dynasty of Egypt
  - The Ninth Dynasty of Egypt
  - The Tenth Dynasty of Egypt
  - Part of the Eleventh Dynasty of Egypt
- Middle Kingdom of Egypt – The period in the history of ancient Egypt between 2055 BC and 1650 BC. This period includes:
  - Later part of the Eleventh Dynasty of Egypt
  - The Twelfth Dynasty of Egypt
  - The Thirteenth Dynasty of Egypt
  - The Fourteenth Dynasty of Egypt

Some writers include the Thirteenth and Fourteenth Dynasties in the Second Intermediate Period.

- Second Intermediate Period of Egypt (Hyksos) – a period when Ancient Egypt fell into disarray for a second time, between the end of the Middle Kingdom and the start of the New Kingdom. It is best known as the period when the Hyksos made their appearance in Egypt. This period of disunity comprises
  - The Fifteenth Dynasty of Egypt
  - The Sixteenth Dynasty of Egypt
  - The Abydos Dynasty
  - The Seventeenth Dynasty of Egypt
- New Kingdom of Egypt – Also referred to as the Egyptian Empire is the period in ancient Egyptian history between the 16th century BC and the 11th century BC, covering:
  - The Eighteenth Dynasty of Egypt
  - The Nineteenth Dynasty of Egypt
  - The Twentieth Dynasty of Egypt
- Third Intermediate Period – The time in Ancient Egypt from the death of Pharaoh Ramesses XI in 1070 BC to the foundation of the Twenty-Sixth Dynasty by Psamtik I in 664 BC. This period includes:
  - The Twenty-first Dynasty of Egypt
  - The Twenty-second Dynasty of Egypt
  - The Twenty-third Dynasty of Egypt
  - The Twenty-fourth Dynasty of Egypt
  - The Twenty-fifth Dynasty of Egypt
- Late Period of ancient Egypt
  - The Twenty-sixth Dynasty of Egypt, also known as the Saite Period, lasted from 672 BC to 525 BC.
  - The Twenty-seventh Dynasty of Egypt The First Persian Period (525 BC–404 BC), this period saw Egypt conquered by an expansive Persian Empire under Cambyses.
  - The Twenty-eighth Dynasty of Egypt consisted of a single king, Amyrtaeus, prince of Sais, who rebelled against the Persians. This dynasty lasted 6 years, from 404 BC to 398 BC.
  - The Twenty-ninth Dynasty of Egypt ruled from Mendes, for the period from 398 BC to 380 BC.
  - The Thirtieth Dynasty consisted of a series of three pharaohs ruling from 380 BC until their final defeat in 343 BC lead to the re-occupation by the Persians.
  - The Thirty-first Dynasty of Egypt was effectively a satrapy of the Achaemenid Persian Empire between 343 BC to 332 BC.
  - The Ptolemaic dynasty ruled the Ptolemaic Kingdom during the Hellenistic period, from 305 to 30 BC. They were the last dynasty of ancient Egypt.
  - The Roman/Byzantine reign lasted from 30 BC to 646 AD.
  - The Muslim conquest of Egypt took place between 639 and 646 AD.

=== History of ancient Egypt, by region ===
- History of Alexandria

=== History of ancient Egypt, by subject ===
- Battle of the Delta
- Battle of Djahy
- Battle of Kadesh
- Battle of Megiddo (15th century BC)
- Battle of the Nile (47 BC)
- Battle of Pelusium
- Battle of Perire
- Egyptian chronology
- Egyptian–Hittite peace treaty
- History of the Karnak Temple complex
- History of timekeeping devices in Egypt
- Military history of Ancient Egypt
- Periodization of Ancient Egypt
- Population history of Egypt
- Sack of Thebes
- Siege of Dapur

== Egyptology ==
Egyptology – study of ancient Egyptian history, language, literature, religion, architecture and art from the 5th millennium BC until the end of its native religious practices in the 4th century AD. A practitioner of the discipline is an "Egyptologist".

=== Egyptologists ===
Egyptologist – a practitioner of Egyptology

- Edward R. Ayrton
- Giovanni Battista Belzoni
- Ludwig Borchardt
- Jaroslav Černý
- Alan Gardiner
- Selim Hassan
- Zahi Hawass
- Salima Ikram
- Antonio Loprieno
- Auguste Mariette
- Gaston Maspero
- Édouard Naville
- William Matthew Flinders Petrie
- Kim Ryholt

=== Museums with ancient Egyptian exhibits ===
Museums of Egyptian antiquities

==== Egypt ====
- Egyptian Museum
- Giza Solar boat museum
- Grand Egyptian Museum
- Karanis Site Museum
- Luxor Museum
- Luxor Mummification Museum
- National Museum of Egyptian Civilization
- Luxor Museum

==== France ====
- Louvre

==== Germany ====
- Bonn Egyptian Museum
- Egyptian Museum of Berlin
- Staatliche Sammlung für Ägyptische Kunst

==== Italy ====
- Egyptian Museum (Milan)
- Museo Egizio, Turin
- Palermo Archeological Museum

==== United Kingdom ====
- British Museum
- Petrie Museum of Egyptology
- Ashmolean Museum

==== United States ====
- Brooklyn Museum
- Metropolitan Museum of Art
- Rosicrucian Egyptian Museum

== Culture of ancient Egypt ==
Culture of ancient Egypt

- Calendar
- Cats in ancient Egypt
- Clothing in ancient Egypt
  - Ancient Egyptian flint jewelry
  - Beauty and cosmetics in ancient Egypt
  - Coiled sewn sandals
  - Khat
  - Nemes
  - Pectoral
  - Shendyt
  - Usekh collar
- Cuisine of ancient Egypt
- Dance in ancient Egypt
- Egyptian astronomy
- Egyptian mathematics
  - Ancient Egyptian multiplication
  - Egyptian algebra
  - Egyptian geometry
  - Egyptian fraction
  - Egyptian numerals
- Festivals in ancient Egypt
  - Beautiful Festival of the Valley
  - Min festival
  - Opet Festival
  - Sed festival
- Homosexuality in ancient Egypt
- Literature
- Medicine
  - Ancient Egyptian anatomical studies
  - Egyptian medical papyri
- Music of Egypt
- Philosophy
- Symbols of ancient Egypt
  - Ankh
  - Atef
  - Deshret
  - Djed
  - Hedjet
  - Pschent
  - Uraeus
  - Was scepter
  - Winged sun
- Technology of ancient Egypt
  - Ancient Egyptian units of measurement
  - Stone quarries of ancient Egypt

=== Architecture of ancient Egypt ===
Ancient Egyptian architecture

- Egyptian pyramids
  - Egyptian pyramid construction techniques
  - Giza pyramid complex
  - Pyramidion
  - Step pyramid
- Egyptian temple
  - Pylon
- False door
- Gardens of ancient Egypt
- Obelisk
- Urban planning in ancient Egypt

==== Buildings and structures ====
- Block statue
- Egyptian pyramids _{(List)}
  - Giza pyramid complex
    - Great Pyramid of Giza
- Great Sphinx of Giza
- Karnak Temple
- Lighthouse of Alexandria
- Library of Alexandria
- Luxor temple
- Mammisi
- Mastaba
- Serdab

=== Art of ancient Egypt ===
Art of ancient Egypt

- Amarna art
- Ancient Egyptian pottery
- Egyptian faience
- Funerary art in Ancient Egypt
- Painting in Ancient Egypt
- Portraiture in Ancient Egypt
- Sculpture in Ancient Egypt

=== Religion in ancient Egypt ===
Ancient Egyptian religion

- Ancient Egyptian afterlife beliefs
- Ancient Egyptian deities
  - Egyptian pantheon
    - Ennead
      - Atum
      - Shu
      - Tefnut
      - Geb
      - Nut
      - Osiris
      - Isis
      - Horus
      - Set
      - Nephthys
    - Ogdoad of Hermopolis
      - Amun and Amunet
      - Heh and Hauhet
      - Kek and Kauket
      - Nu and Naunet
    - Theban Triad
      - Amun
      - Mut
      - Khonsu
    - Major deities
      - Amun · Anhur · Anubis · Apep · Apis · Aten · Bastet · Bennu · Hathor · Khepri · Khnum · Khonsu · Montu · Mut · Neith · Ptah · Ra · Sekhmet · Set · Shu · Sobek · Thoth
    - Other deities
      - Ammit · Bes · Maahes · Min · Pakhet · Seker · Seshat · Tawaret · Wadjet · Wepwawet
- Ancient Egyptian funerary practices
  - Canopic jars
  - Mummy
    - List of Egyptian mummies (royalty)
    - Opening of the mouth ceremony
  - Reserve head
  - Wooden tomb model
- Ancient Egyptian funerary texts
  - Amduat
  - Book of Caverns
  - Book of Gates
  - Book of Nut
  - Book of the Dead
    - Book of the Dead spells
  - Book of the Earth
  - Book of the Heavenly Cow
  - Book of the Netherworld
  - Book of Traversing Eternity
  - Books of Breathing
  - Litany of Re
  - Litany of the Eye of Horus
  - Spell of the Twelve Caves
  - Coffin Texts
  - Pyramid Texts
- Ancient Egyptian offering formula
- Ancient Egyptian retainer sacrifices
- Mortuary temple
- Decline of ancient Egyptian religion
- Religious concepts
  - Aaru
  - Akh
  - Ba
  - Duat
  - Egyptian soul
  - Isfet
  - Ka
  - Kek
  - Maat
  - Shai
- Egyptian mythology
  - Major myths
    - Ancient Egyptian creation myths
    - Osiris myth
  - Numbers in Egyptian mythology

=== Ancient Egyptian language ===
Ancient Egyptian language

- Stages of ancient Egyptian language
  - Archaic Egyptian: before 2600 BC, the language of the Early Dynastic Period. Egyptian writing in the form of labels and signs has been dated to 3200 BC.
  - Old Egyptian: 2686 BC – 2181 BC, the language of the Old Kingdom
  - Middle Egyptian: 2055 BC – 1650 BC, characterized the Middle Kingdom (2055 BC – 1650 BC), but endured through the early 18th Dynasty until the Amarna Period (1353 BC), and continued on as a literary language into the 4th century AD.
  - Late Egyptian: 1069 BC – 700 BC, characterized the Third Intermediate Period (1069 BC – 700 BC), but started earlier with the Amarna Period (1353 BC).
  - Demotic: 7th century BC – 5th century AD, from the Late Period through Roman times
  - Coptic: 1st century AD – 17th century AD, from early Roman times to early modern times
- Writing systems
  - Hieroglyphs
    - Cursive hieroglyphs
  - Hieratic
  - Demotic
- Decipherment of ancient Egyptian scripts
- Transliteration of Ancient Egyptian

== Egyptian economy ==
- Ancient Egyptian agriculture
  - Cattle count
- Ancient Egyptian trade
  - Foreign contacts of ancient Egypt
- Mining industry of Egypt
- Palace economy
- Stone quarries of ancient Egypt

== Publications about ancient Egypt ==
- Ancient Egypt (magazine)
- Ancient Egyptian Hieroglyphs: A Practical Guide
- Hieroglyphics: The Writings of Ancient Egypt
- The Hieroglyphs of Ancient Egypt
- Oxford Encyclopedia of Ancient Egypt
- Reading Egyptian Art: A Hieroglyphic Guide to Ancient Egyptian Painting and Sculpture

The following outline is provided as an overview of a topical guide to ancient Egypt: Ancient Egypt – ancient civilization of eastern North Africa, concentrated along the lower reaches of the Nile River in what is now the modern country of Egypt. Egyptian civilization coalesced around 3150 BC (according to conventional Egyptian chronology) with the political unification of Upper and Lower Egypt under the first pharaoh. The many achievements of the ancient Egyptians include the quarrying, surveying and construction techniques that facilitated the building of monumental pyramids, temples, and obelisks; a system of mathematics; a practical and effective system of medicine; irrigation systems and agricultural production techniques; some of the first known ships; Egyptian faience and glass technology; new forms of literature; and the earliest known peace treaty. Its monuments have inspired the imaginations of travelers and writers for centuries.

== See also ==
- Index of ancient Egypt–related articles
- Glossary of ancient Egypt artifacts
- Outline of classical studies

Ancient Egypt lists

- List of ancient Egyptians
- List of ancient Egyptian sites
- List of ancient Egyptian palettes
- List of ancient Egyptian papyri
- List of ancient Egyptian scribes
- List of ancient Egyptian temples
- List of Egyptian hieroglyphs
- List of Egyptian pyramids
- List of pharaohs
- List of portraiture offerings with Ancient Egyptian hieroglyphs
- List of Theban tombs
- Lists of Egyptian hieroglyphs
