= List of mythical creatures in Egyptian mythology =

- Abtu - A sacred fish.
- Akhekh - A winged hybrid of a bird and oryx, often considered a dragon or serpent of darkness.
- Anat – A sacred fish.
- Axex – A kind of griffin.
- Apshait – A flesh-eating beetle mentioned in the Book of the Dead.
- Medjed – A sacred Elephantfish that ate the penis of Osiris.
- Sak – A monster with the head of a hawk, the body of a lion, hindquarters of a horse, numerous triangular mammaries, and the tail as a fully bloomed lotus.
- Serpopard - A monster resembling a leopard with a long serpentine neck.
- Sha – The Set Animal, a vaguely caniform monster associated with the god Set.
- Sphinx - Creatures with the bodies of lions, used as pharonic symbols.
  - Androsphinx - A Sphinx with a human head.
  - Criosphinx - A Sphinx with the head of a ram.
  - Hieracosphinx - A Sphinx with the head of a hawk.
- Uraeus – sacred cobra symbol.
