= A Tale in the Desert =

- Publisher(s): Desert Nomad Studios
- Platform(s): Windows, Linux, Mac
- Release: Tale 1: 2003; Tale 2: 2004; Tale 3: 2006; Tale 4: 2008; Tale 5: 2010; Tale 6: 2011; Tale 7: 2015; Tale 8: 2018; Tale 9: 2019; Tale 10: 2021; Tale 11: 2023
- Genre(s): MMORPG
- Mode(s): Multiplayer

A Tale in the Desert (ATITD) is a massively multiplayer online roleplaying game (MMORPG) set in Ancient Egypt. The initial software download and all new content are free, with a monthly subscription required to play beyond the first 24 hours.

During the 7th Annual Interactive Achievement Awards, the Academy of Interactive Arts & Sciences nominated A Tale in the Desert for "Massively Mutliplayer/Persistent World Game of the Year".

== Gameplay ==
Two players standing near the sea

A Tale in the Desert is a social MMORPG which does not include combat. Instead, a variety of social activities provide for the basis of most interaction in the game. The game's main focuses are building, community, research and personal or group challenges called "Tests". ATITD has a global foregame, midgame, and endgame: on average so far, every year and a half the game ends, achievements are tabulated, and a new "Telling" begins, with certain modifications requested by the player base, or by arbitrary developer choice. To be clear about this, the game actually ends; a wipe is performed, and the game (and all players) start from scratch using the mechanism that it is now a couple of player generations removed. Within a Telling, players can write, introduce, and pass laws (including player bans), and make feature requests.

There is an in-game economy, including an amount of regional or global trade; however, there is no official, backed currency. Players can mint their own currencies but these have never had widespread adoption. Additionally, there are sufficient activities to be learned and performed that it is considered exceedingly difficult to be a Jack of all trades: this too leads itself to a much more social aspect.

A recurring theme is a "welcoming island" which established players can enter at any time: this allows them to train new players at their own leisure, and introduce them to the specifics of the game. After completing a series of tasks given to them, players may make their way to the mainland and begin the real game.

When a new player exits the welcoming island into mainland Egypt, they may immediately begin trekking around to look for a suitable settlement location or community. Upon reaching the mainland, the first goal of most players is to begin the central challenges of the game (Tests), find public resources, and expand upon what knowledge they have while integrating themselves into the community at large.

ATITD has a legal system, a controlled variant on Nomic which is generally restricted by what the developers can code, as well as the nature of such a system. With the legal system, players have the option to create petitions of any kind, like the redistribution of expired accounts' materials, the direct ban of a player, or even a change in an avatar's sex. The legal system as currently defined can only restrict players' options, alter ownership rights, or change a minor portion of a challenge; however, within those options, the possibilities have not been exhausted. Finally, the legal system also requires a great deal of cooperation between players, as a petition must be spread, signed, and returned with a certain threshold of signatures.

This game has no physical combat system, however, the psychological combat of social PVP can be very intense. While players do not engage in direct combat, the social tests in the game (many of which require community votes) encourage social combat which encourages the best and worst social behavior in players. More than one player has wondered (correctly) if this game is a sociology experiment in progress.

== Tests ==
The majority of ATITD challenges take the form of 56 defined "Tests", separated into several groups. Of these, the first in each group is a trivial request, intended to introduce players to the discipline - the group that challenge is in. Beyond those initiations, seven challenges exist for each discipline, arranged into themes:

- The Architecture Discipline is based around building large and potentially ornate structures, such as a useful aqueduct or an exceptional burial temple. The secondary goal of Architecture is to complete these projects as simply and efficiently as possible, which can require substantial planning, trading, and cooperation.
- The Art Discipline is primarily based around creative expression in a limited framework, with players building mosaics, breeding scarabs for colour and pattern, forming fireworks out of basic materials, or creating detailed sculptures.
- The Body Discipline is focused around surveying the land, both socially and geographically, to determine where various resources are. Some of the challenges within involve finding 35 different varieties of mushroom, or deducing the locations of cicadas hidden by other players.
- The now-defunct Conflict discipline, removed in the third Telling to make way for Harmony, was centered on the pursuit of excellence in a series of games, generally with perfect information. These games, such as variants on checkers and euchre, are now played in weekly or biweekly tournaments.
- The Harmony discipline, new to the third Telling, is generally focused around knowing one's fellow players; many of these were based on a discussion at the Ludium game developer conference. They include Marriage, where a player gives reciprocal access to their account and goods to another, as well as Mentorship, which requires players to enter the mentoring island and assist someone in becoming a citizen.
- The Leadership discipline is much like the Harmony discipline in that the participant is required to know his or her fellow players, but rather than predicting their actions, one must influence them positively. One of the tests in Leadership, the Test of the Demi-Pharaoh, requires the player to be elected among all their peers; the reward, accordingly, is the ability to ban seven players from the game. Other tests include a Survivor-like game between 12 people, or the formation of a bureaucracy.
- The Thought discipline is centered on the creation of numerous puzzles: the goal here is to make said puzzles simple enough that they can be effectively solved, but difficult enough to be challenging for the majority of players. Among those puzzles available are logic mazes and a modification on the popular Rush Hour.
- The Worship discipline is centered on the need to please various deities, often through an organized group of players working in unison. The Test most characteristic of this is that of Festivals, which requires 100 players to act in unison within one hour, on a global basis.

Upon completing a Test, a player advances in rank for that discipline. The various ranks range from Initiate to Oracle, and determine one's proficiency in the discipline. At the Oracle rank, where the player has completed all seven Tests, they may build a Monument to celebrate that discipline. Furthermore, if 127 disciples are found to take part in it, the players may create a challenge for the next Telling, to replace one of those used before.

The ultimate goal of the game, therefore, can be summed up as "having enough players cooperate and complete the Tests for every discipline so that seven Monuments can be built before the end".

=== First Telling ===
The First Telling was released on February 15, 2003, after approximately three years of open testing. While considered to have more bugs than the others, it also had a tight-knit community, formed in part by the crossover of various guilds during the beta. So far, this is the only Telling to have "won" the game, by completing the main challenges; it lasted approximately one and a half years, and ended on September 2, 2004.

Kemet was a German server running concurrently with the first Telling, although released on February 1, 2003: while the international version was produced solely by eGenesis, much of the work on Kemet was done by MDO Games, an overseas publisher. Ultimately, due to the extremely low population of the version, it was dropped for the second incarnation, but the result carried over into the next international version. Additionally, the majority of MDO's translations from English to German were kept. Kemet ended at the same time as the first international Telling.

=== The Second Telling ===
The Second Telling began on September 3, 2004, with a host of changes: one new challenge was released for each discipline to replace an old one, over the course of the game, as well as a second test for the discipline of Worship. This Telling implemented changes to various technologies from the first, as well as an overhaul of the GUI; a different tutorial for newcomers replaced the old midway through. The players did not manage to complete the challenges in the second Telling, but did finish Monuments for the disciplines of Architecture, Body, Leadership, and Worship. The Telling ended on May 24, 2006, roughly 627 days after its inception.

=== The Third Telling ===
The Third Telling, released on approximately May 30, 2006. A relatively loose leveling system was added as a means to connect with gamers who are more familiar with mainstream MMORPG design. The Discipline of Conflict was dropped in favor of a new discipline, the Discipline of Harmony. Mining was returned to something more like the first tale, but with its own mysterious workings. The Test of Mentorship was modified to fix an issue that made it more challenging for those who began to play late in the tale. Additionally, an in-game event calendar was added, so that developers and players could more easily communicate events without the need for a third party website. A player named Orchid received Oracle of Seven (finished all seven tests of every type) and was first to do so. The Telling ended on December 11, 2008, roughly 926 days after its inception.

=== The Fourth Telling ===
The Fourth Telling was released on December 13, 2008. New graphics were introduced and the user interface was updated.

eGenesis launched a second shard, called Bastet, on February 20, 2010 This server ran concurrent with the main shard for the fourth telling, and used most of the same code, but with the exception that all of the tests were unlockable immediately - thus making the speed of this tale completely player-controlled.

=== The Fifth Telling ===
The Fifth Telling was released on August 7, 2010.

=== The Sixth Telling ===
The Sixth Telling was released on December 3, 2011.

In early 2014, Pluribus Games, took over ongoing development and operation of ATITD. The game at this point remained basically the version as defined by the prior ownership. From a player perspective, no gameplay changes were felt until the next telling.

=== The Seventh Telling ===
The Seventh Telling was released on September 11, 2015. From a player perspective, the game changed ownership with this telling. All Tests from past and current Tellings were made available, as opposed to only seven per discipline, and seven new challenges were added.

=== The Eighth Telling ===
The Eighth Telling began on March 2, 2018, and ended on August 30, 2019. The game changed ownership to player-run Desert Nomad Studios.

=== The Ninth Telling ===
The Ninth Telling started on August 30, 2019, and ended on May 25, 2021. Levels (reached by passing tests and principles) were replaced by experience points, earned by using crafting skills. The telling also introduced talents: specializations ("soft classes") that let the player spend talent points (earned by doings tasks and tests) on stat bonuses and special abilities. For example, The Weaver received bonuses to endurance, focus and dexterity and one of its traits was "Offline Flax: Adds the ability to gather flax offline".

=== The Tenth Telling ===
The Tenth Telling started on May 29, 2021.

== Controversy ==
Because of the social aspect of A Tale in the Desert, players tend to react more strongly to events which break or strain social mores, even when these events are introduced by the developers rather than rogue players. Because, in the legal system, players can implement punishments or bans against others, the effect is most often caused by characters played by eGenesis staff. Some examples include:

- In the first Telling, a player named Knightmare and two others created a character to attempt to force players to use the legal system more responsibly. After one of those other players damaged a public facility by removing a vital resource, the character, Mafia, was banned.
- Additionally, in the first Telling, the developers brought in a character named Khepry, whose actions indirectly led to pollution and depleted resources.
- Throughout the Tellings, skills have been released which provide a positive benefit to the user, and a detriment to everyone else. These "Stranger" skills, named after the game's primary antagonist, have often caused a great stir. This social dynamic of some win/most lose became a basic social standard of the game. For all the Tellings, players are challenged to decide between their personal benefit and the NPC and player nation's benefit. This will become an ongoing choice for all succeeding Tellings.
- An example of a Stranger skill that caused drama throughout Egypt, was the "Clear Cutting" skill introduced in September 2003. The skill allowed players to gather large amounts of wood per tree harvested, but resulted in long delays, multiple days, before the tree was restocked with harvestable wood. Massive deforestation of some regions results. At one point, 3450 trees out of a total of around 15300 are clearcut. A flood of laws to control the situation arrive at the voting booth, and calm returns within a couple weeks.
- In the second Telling, the events team created a character named Malaki. A thief from Persia, Malaki traded worthless chaff for worthwhile materials, but most problematic of all was the absolute disregard he had for any and all female characters - he made several references to slavery and subjugation, which eventually led to him being driven out of the game, though according to Andrew Tepper, the simple controversy brought in more players than it drove away.
- In the third Telling, a series of mysterious chests washed ashore and opened by players brought Lung Spore Disease, which made particular tasks more difficult while players searched for a cure.
- The Test of the Demi-Pharaoh allows a player who has been elected "Demi-Pharaoh" to ban up to seven characters each. One player is elected to this position roughly once per month, but once elected, that player is a Demi-Pharaoh for the remainder of that telling. Although this position is hard to obtain, it is controversial because the Demi-Pharaoh's power extends into the real world: essentially taking away another player's ability to play their character. This has happened on multiple occasions resulting in the removal of some player characters from the game.
