= Akhekh =

Ancient Egyptian Mythical creature

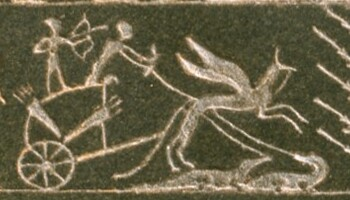
- An Akhekh pulling an archer's chariot over two crocodiles on the Metternich stele

Creature information
- Other name(s): Axex, Akekhu
- Similar entities: Hippogriff, Griffin, Dragon, Serpent

Origin
- Country: Ancient Egypt
- Habitat: Deserts

The Akhekh (also transliterated as Akekhu) is a legendary creature in Egyptian mythology and art. Ancient Egyptian myth writes of the Akhekh living in the deserts west of the Nile.

== Etymology ==
The name comes from kkw, the Egyptian word for darkness. The term Akhekh is also used as an Egyptian word for darkness and shade.

== Appearance ==
All descriptions of the creature have it as a quadruped with bird's wings, though different sources diverge: one description is that of an Oryx with a bird's wings and beak as well as serpent's tail, while French archaeologist Paul Pierret gave it in a book of his as a winged lion akin to the griffin of European mythology. Additional sources describe the Akhekh as being a hybrid of animals such as hippo, crocodile, turtle and a donkey.

Some early interpretations of the Akhekh depict it as a dragon or drake, often with a serpentine shape and a reptilian head. Other interpretations portray it with a bird-like head, resembling the griffin or hippogriff (and the axex may be the same as it). Additionally, it is often interpreted as a seclusive dragon or serpent of darkness, as well as a creature of the night. The term Akhekh has frequently been cited as an Egyptian term for dragons and griffins. A common trait of the Akhekh is that its body resembles an antelope and its head is adorned with three uraei (snake heads). Another intepretation is that the Akhekh has feathers that furnish fire and is known as the "bird of thunder".

== Role ==
The Akhekh was associated with the god Set, as well as his domains of darkness, the western desert, chaos, and water. Much like the Sha, it was either an ally of the god or an incarnation of Set. It also symbolised power and strength of the pharaoh during wartime, such as Ramesses II being compared to the Akhekh as he conquered the Hittites and terrorised them. The Metternich stele in particular depicts an Akhekh pulling an archer's chariot over two crocodiles.

== See also ==
- List of mythical creatures in Egyptian mythology
- Set animal
