= Numbers in Egyptian mythology =

Certain numbers were considered sacred, holy, or magical by the ancient Egyptians, particularly 2, 3, 4, 7, and their multiples and sums.

== Three: symbol of plurality ==
The basic symbol for plurality among the ancient Egyptians was the number three: even the way they wrote the word for "plurality" in hieroglyphics consisted of three vertical marks (𓏼). Triads of deities were also used in Egyptian religion to signify a complete system. Examples include references to the god Atum "when he was one and became three" when he gave birth to Shu and Tefnut, and the triad of Horus, Osiris, and Isis.

Examples

- The beer used to trick Sekhmet soaked three hands into the ground.
- The second god, Re, named three times to define the sun: dawn, noon, and evening.
- Thoth is described as the “thrice-great god of wisdom”.
- A doomed prince was doomed to three fates: to die by a crocodile, a serpent, or a dog.
- Three groups of three attempts each (nine attempts) were required for a legendary peasant to recover his stolen goods.
- A boasting mage claimed to be able to cast a great darkness to last three days.
- After asking Thoth for help, a King of Ethiopia was brought to Thebes and publicly beaten three further times.
- An Ethiopian mage tried—and failed—three times to defeat the greatest mage of Egypt.
- An Egyptian mage, in an attempt to enter the land of the dead, threw a certain powder on a fire three times.
- There are twelve (three times four) sections of the Egyptian land of the dead. The dead disembark at the third.
- The Knot of Isis, representing life, has three loops.

== Five ==
Examples

- The second god, Rê, named five gods and goddesses.
- Thoth added five days to the year by winning the light from the Moon in a game of gambling.
- It took five days for the five children of Nut and Geb to be born. These are Osiris, Nephthys, Isis, Set and Haroeris (Horus the Elder) - not be mistaken with Harpocrates (Horus the Younger), who defeated Set in battle.
- A boasting mage claimed to be able to bring the Pharaoh of Egypt to Ethiopia and by magic, have him beaten with a rod five hundred (five times five times five times four) times, and return him to Egypt in the space of five hours.
- An Ethiopian mage comes to challenge Egypt's greatest mage—to reading of a sealed letter—five hundred (five times five times five times four) years after the atrocity depicted in it occurred.
- The star, or pentagram, representing the afterlife, has five points.

Fives are less common in Egyptian mythology.

== Seven: symbol of perfection, effectiveness, completeness ==
The number seven was apparently the Egyptian symbol of such ideas as perfection, effectiveness, and completeness.

Examples

- Seven thousand barrels of red beer were used to trick Sekhmet out of killing.
- In her search for her husband's pieces, the goddess Isis was guarded by seven scorpions.
- A legendary famine lasted seven years.
- The lowest amount that the Nile flooded to solve the famine was seven cubits. The highest was 28 cubits (four times seven).
- A doomed prince found a tower seventy (ten times seven) cubits high with seventy (ten times seven) windows.
- Set tore the god Osiris’ body into fourteen pieces: seven each for the two regions of Upper and Lower Egypt.
- The Pool symbol, representing water, contains seven zigzag lines.
- The Gold symbol has seven spines on its underside.

== See also ==
- Numerology
- Numbers in Norse mythology
- Egyptian mythology
