= Festival Songs of Isis and Nephthys =

Ancient Egyptian literature

Isis, Egyptian goddess

Nephthys, Egyptian goddess

The Festival Songs of Isis and Nephthys are a work of ancient Egyptian literature whose author is unknown. Probably not older than the Twenty-sixth Dynasty, the songs form part of the funeral hieratic papyrus of Nesi Ámsu (No. 10158 in the British Museum). The title is “The Verses of the Festival of the two Zerti,” and the papyrus tells us it was to be sung by two virgins in the temple of Osiris on the occasion of the annual festival held for five days in the fourth month of the sowing season. The verses concern the killing of Osiris by Set, and the later reconstruction of Osiris' body by the goddesses Isis and Nephthys.

== Variant readings and related texts ==
There is evidence in the text that other copies existed, and that it was old enough to allow variant readings having crept in. With the “Litanies of Seker,” which follows, consisting of four columns, it occupies twenty-one of the thirty-three columns of the whole papyrus. The second composition which was evidently intended to be sung after the Festival Verses, consists of three parts: I. A Litany to the Sun-God; II. A Recitation by Isis; III. A Litany to the Hathors. During the sixteen repetitions of it which were required, it was to have an accompaniment of tambourines.

A hieratic papyrus of Berlin contains a work very similar to the “Festival Songs”. It has been translated by M. de Horrack, and is entitled “Les Lamentations d'Isis et Nephthys.”
