= Aati =

Ancient Egyptian judge of the dead

Aati, also called Ati, meaning "a leper", was an Egyptian god and one of the 42 judges of the dead. Aati comes from Heliopolis. The god will question the sins of a soul traveling through the underworld. The soul of the dead was supposed to deny the accusation by responding with the line: "O Aati who comes from Heliopolis, I have not foolishly set my mouth in motion against another man." His name is found on the Papyrus of Nebsemy, which is a copy of the Book of the Dead.
