= Henet =

Egyptian Pelican deity

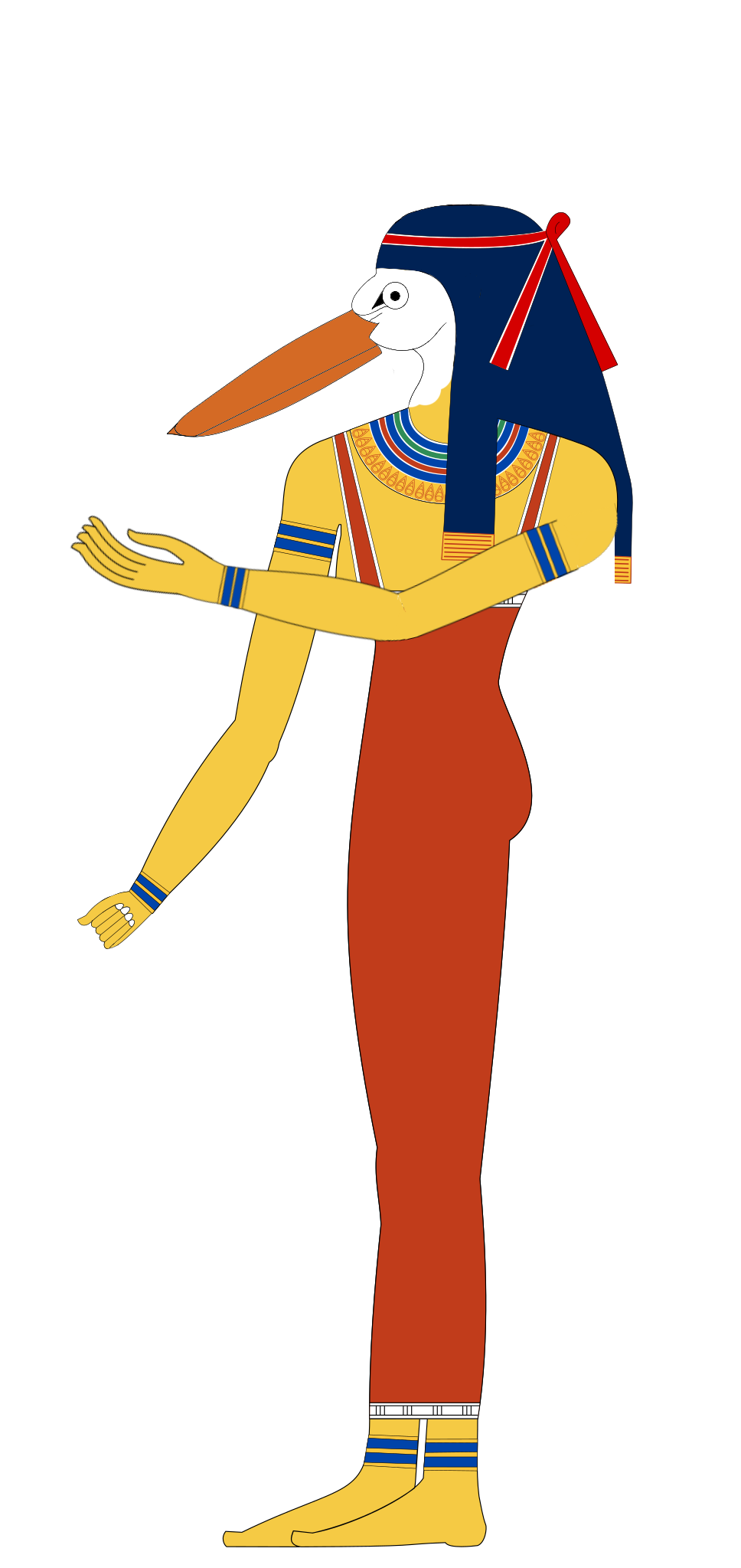
- drawing of Henet depicted as a Pelican-headed woman
Name in hieroglyphs
H n t G39 B1

Henet or the Pelican is the Ancient Egyptian goddess of pelicans. She is mentioned in the Pyramid Texts.

The Pelican (Henet in Egyptian) is depicted in livestock scenes the walls of tombs of people from the Pharaoh's court. She appears in royal funerary texts from the Pyramid Age as a protective symbol against snakes. Scholar George Hart says that the imagery in the texts of a pelican falling into the Nile suggests that Henet scoops dangerous elements out of the water in the form of fish. This is similar to the dragnets and bird nets used for trapping sinners in the Underworld. Scholars think that Henet is a goddess because she is called "mother of the king" in the Pyramid Texts. In ancient Egypt, that term was used exclusively for goddesses.

Hart continues to say that, in other funerary papyri, the pelican can predict safe travel for a dead person in the Underworld. The open beak of the Pelican is also associated with the ability of the deceased person to leave the burial chamber and go out into the rays of the sun, possibly an analogy made between the long cavernous beak of the pelican and the tomb shaft.
