= Sepa (god) =

Ancient Egyptian deity

- Sepa depicted as a mummified man with horns
Name in hieroglyphs
z p pA L5
- Major cult center: Kheraha and Heliopolis

Sepa was an ancient Egyptian centipede deity. He was believed to have control over venomous animals and was worshiped to prevent attacks from venomous animals. He also held a role as a fertility god because centipedes will hunt earthworms which helps make soil more fertile. Sepa also was a protector of the dead because centipedes were sometimes seen attacking insects eating dead bodies.

== Iconography ==
Sepa was depicted either as a mummified man with two centipede-like horns or as a mummified man with a donkey head.
