= Apesh =

Ancient Egyptian deity

- Apesh, based on a turtle headed god
Name in hieroglyphs
a p S Styw
- Enemy: Ra

In ancient Egyptian religion, Apesh was a god of the night who was represented with the head of a turtle or tortoise. Ancient Egyptians considered turtles to be evil, and Apesh was therefore seen as an evil god. In the Book of the Dead, the turtle— and by extension, Apesh— is described as an "enemy of Ra". In chapter 161 of the Book of the Dead, Thoth is quoted repeating "May Ra live and turtle die".

== See also ==
- Apophis
- Cultural depictions of turtles in Ancient Egypt
