= Hedetet =

Ancient Egyptian scorpion goddess

Hededet
Name in hieroglyphs
H d d t L7

Hededet or Hedjedjet (ḥdd.t) is a scorpion goddess of the ancient Egyptian religion. She resembles Serket in many ways, but was in later periods merged into Isis. She was depicted with the head of a scorpion, nursing a baby. She is mentioned in the Book of the Dead.
