= Ancient Egyptian offering formula =

Dedicatory formula on funerary objects

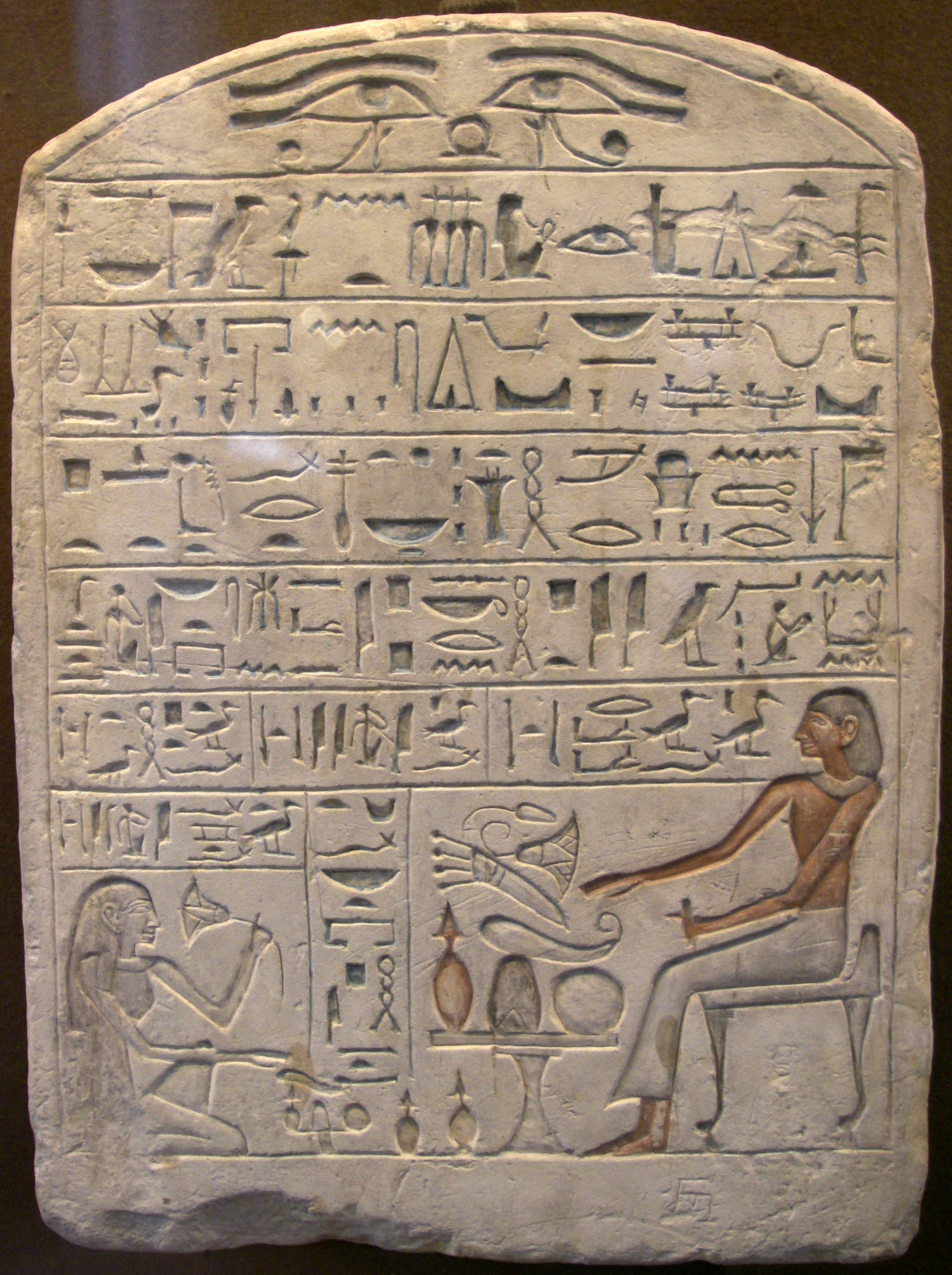
The offering formula shown on a funerary stela. On this particular stela, the formula begins on the first line and reads from right to left.

The offering formula, also known under transliterated forms of its incipit as the ḥtp-ḏỉ-nsw or ḥtp-ḏj-nswt formula was a conventional dedicatory formula inscribed on ancient Egyptian funerary objects, believed to allow the deceased to partake in offerings presented to the major deities in the name of the king, or in offerings presented directly to the deceased by family members. It is among the most common of all Middle Egyptian texts.

Its incipit ḥtp-ḏj-nswt "an offering given by the king" is followed by the name of a deity and a list of offerings given. The offering formula is usually found carved or painted onto stelae, false doors, coffins, figurines, and myriad other funerary goods. Each person had their own name and titles put into the formula. The offering formula was not a royal prerogative like some of the other religious texts such as the Litany of Re, and was used by anyone who could afford to have one made.

== History and development ==
=== Origins ===
Offerings to the dead were part of Egyptian religious practices since prehistoric times. The offering formula, which emerged around the 4th Dynasty and remained in use until the Roman period, developed from ideologies about death and the afterlife. Religious beliefs about death emphasized transformation (allowing the deceased to dwell eternally in the afterlife) and sustenance. These concepts were tied to actions that had to be performed by the living (for instance, embalming), theoretically preserving the relationship between living and dead in perpetuity.

During the Old Kingdom, the king's position as benefactor of all funerary offerings, at least for elites, was more concrete and a key source of political power. Though this would decline over time, his central role in religious symbolism was retained, and thus his connection to offerings, reflected in the "King's Formula." Both funerary and temple offerings were commonly represented with the Eye of Horus, a symbol of cosmic order and Horus, a god represented on earth by the king.

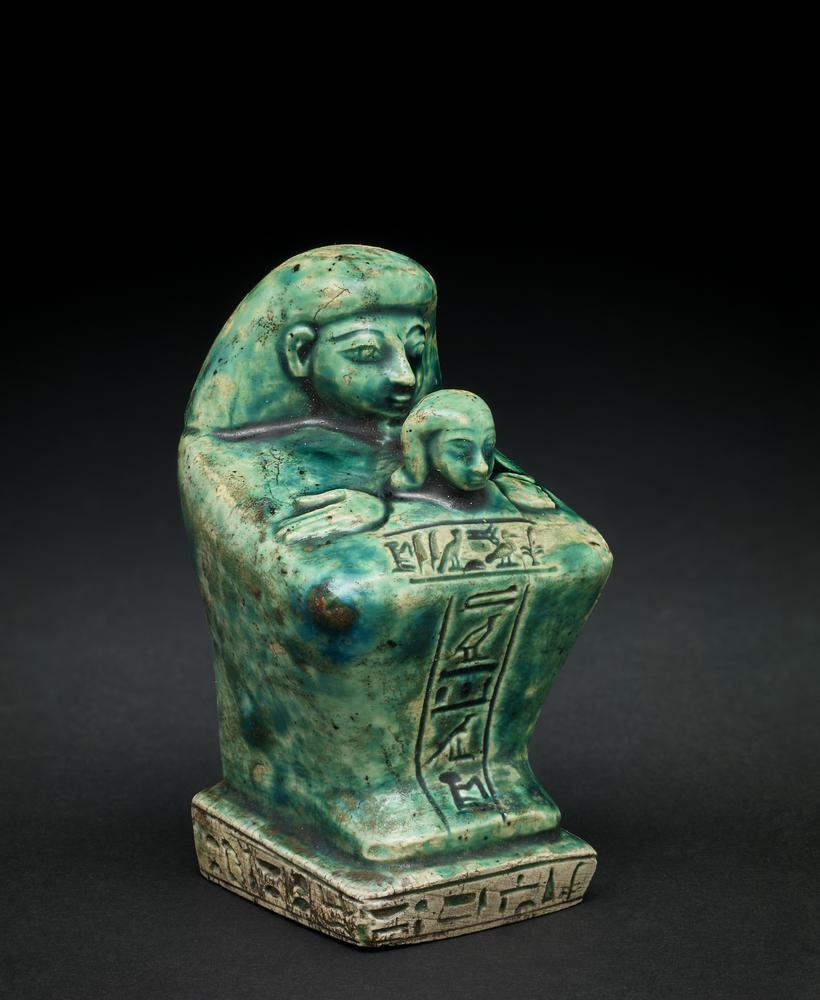
Block statuette representing the deceased glazed in green with offering formula inscription. The figure in front is identified as "Prince Temy." The formula itself is engraved around the plinth, while the vertical inscription on the figure's front is the name of the deceased "Tjunero." A matching vertical inscription on the back provides his title: "Overseer of the cattle of Amun."

=== Purpose and Use ===
The dead were believed to live on but still required the necessities they had in life. It was also believed that, without a physical representation existing in the mundane world, a person could not exist in the afterlife. Representations of items and people, usually figurines, served as symbolic replacements in prehistoric gravesites. Writing was sacred, believed to have been given to humanity by the god Thoth, and could thus serve the same mystical purposes. For those who could not afford to furnish a funerary cult (the vast majority of the population) inscriptions and illustrations were representative stand-ins.

By the Middle Kingdom, the inscription is ubiquitous on tombs and funerary stelae from all walks of life. The inscriptions could then be read aloud, thus providing the enumerated gifts to the deceased. This responsibility, unless a dedicated priest was hired, fell upon the deceased's eldest son or grandson. Formulae generally ask for offerings to be performed on major festival days as well as a catch-all phrase allowing their participation in "daily offerings."

== Structure ==
Painted false door, a typical place for the offering formula, in the Grand Egyptian Museum

All ancient Egyptian offering formulas share the same basic structure, developed early in its use. It consists of four parts: invocation of the king, invocation of a god, the requests, and the naming of the recipient.

The offering formula always begins with the "King's Formula": ḥtp dỉ nsw. This phrase was in use since Old Egyptian and literally means "an offering given by the king." This dedication does not indicate that the gift was personally given by the king; rather, it identifies the funerary offering as being royally authorized. Because the king was seen as an intermediary between the people of Egypt and the gods, the offering was made in his name.

Below is an example of a typical offering formula:

M23 t R4 X8 Q1 D4 nb R11 w O49 t Z1 nTr aA nb U23 b N26 O49
D37 f O3 F1 H1 V6 S27 x t nb t nfr t wab t S34 t nTr i m
n D28 n i F39 x i i F12 s r t z n A1 Aa11 P8

ḥtp dỉ nsw wsỉr nb ḏdw, nṯr ꜥꜣ, nb ꜣbḏw
dỉ=f prt-ḫrw t ḥnqt, kꜣw ꜣpdw, šs mnḫt ḫt nbt nfrt wꜥbt ꜥnḫt nṯr ỉm
n kꜣ n ỉmꜣḫy s-n-wsrt, mꜣꜥ-ḫrw

"An offering given by the king (to) Osiris, the lord of Busiris, the great god, the lord of Abydos."
"That he may give an invocation offering of bread, beer, oxen, birds, alabaster, clothing, and every good and pure thing upon which a god lives."
"For the ka of the revered Senwosret, True of Voice."

=== God's Formula ===
After the King's formula, an invocation to a god is made. Usually the god is Osiris, Anubis, or (rarely) Geb or Wepwawet. This part of the formula identifies the local funerary establishment that actually provided the offering; the offering is seen as being under the auspices of that establishment's patron deity.

There is disagreement among scholars about the exact meaning of this element, particularly in Old and Middle Kingdom uses. Beginning in the later Old Kingdom, repetition of htp or htp dỉ before naming the god is a frequent variation. In A.H. Gardiner's Egyptian Grammar, this construction is taken to be dative and translated: "an offering which the king has given (to) Osiris." This translation, implying a change in meaning between the earlier and later periods of the Old Kingdom, was traditionally in use in the 20th century and influenced models for the dating of Middle Kingdom stelae.

However, more recent scholarship argues that no such dative construction existed in the Old or Middle Kingdom, and thus this instead reflects a stylistic variation in scribal tradition with no change to the formula's meaning. The dative construction was instead, according to this view, a later development, and would therefore have no implication for the substance of the text during this period.

The following phrase is a typical invocation of Osiris:

Q1 D4 nb R11 w O49 t Z1 nTr aA nb U23 b N26 O49wsỉr nb ḏdw, nṯr ꜥꜣ, nb ꜣbḏw
which means "Osiris, the lord of Busiris, the great god, the lord of Abydos."
There was apparently no set rule about what epithets were used; however, "Lord of Busiris," "Great God," and "Lord of Abydos" were very common. Also frequent were:

nb H6 nb G21 H H N5nb ỉmnt nb nḥḥ
meaning "Lord of the West, Lord of Eternity"
Anubis is seen less frequently than Osiris, and usually read,
E15 R4 W17 t nTr O21 D1 N26 fỉnpw, ḫnty sḥ nṯr tpy ḏw=f
meaning "Anubis, he who is in front of his divine booth, he who is on his mountain."

=== Requests ===
After the list of deities and their titles, the formula proceeds with a list of the prt-ḫrw, or "invocation offerings," of which the spirit of the deceased is called to partake. The phrase literally means "the going forth of the voice," i.e., a visitor speaking the standard invocation formula on behalf of the tomb-owner. These basic items were usually bread, beer, oxen, fowl, alabaster, and clothing or textiles, which could be read from a tomb or stela. Outside of basic provisions, requests were often made for successful burial and transition into the next life.

The list is always preceded by the phrase:
D37 f O3orX8 s n O3

dỉ=f prt-ḫrw or dỉ=sn prt-ḫrw
which means "He (or they, in the second example) give(s) invocation offerings."
After this phrase, the list of offerings follows; for example:

D37 f O3 F1 H1 V6 S27 x t nb t nfr t wab t S34 t nTr i m

dỉ=f prt-ḫrw t ḥnqt, kꜣw ꜣpdw, šs mnḥt ḫt nbt nfrt wꜥbt ꜥnḫt nṯr ỉm
meaning "He gives invocation offerings of bread, beer, oxen, birds, alabaster, clothing, and every good and pure thing upon which a god lives."
Sometimes the text at the end of the list is replaced with the phrase:

x t nb t nfr t wab t D37 t D37 p t N1 T14 G1 N16 N21 Z1 W25 n n t V28 D36 p N36 S34 t nTr i mḫt nbt nfrt wꜥbt ddt pt qmꜣ(t) tꜣ ỉnnt ḥꜥp(ỉ) ꜥnḫt nṯr ỉm Meaning "Every good and pure thing that the sky gives, the earth creates, the inundation brings, on which the god lives."

=== Recipient ===
The last part of the offering formula lists the name and titles of the recipient of the invocation offerings. For example:

n D28 n i F39 x i i F12 s r t z n A1 Aa11 P8

n kꜣ n ỉmꜣḫy s-n-wsrt, mꜣꜥ-ḫrw

which means "for the ka of the revered Senwosret, True of Voice."

== See also ==
- Egyptian mythology
- Egyptian soul
- Ancient Egyptian burial customs
- Ancient Egyptian funerary texts
