= Petbe =

Ancient Egyptian deity

Name in hieroglyphs
N1 G53

In Egyptian mythology, Petbe was the god of revenge, worshipped in the area around Akhmim, in central Egypt. His name translates as Sky-Ba, roughly meaning "Soul of the Sky", or "Mood of the sky". However, Petbe may be a Chaldean deity introduced by immigrant workers from the Levant, with his name being a corruption of the hybrid phrase Pet-(Ba'al), meaning "Lord of the sky". Early Christians compared Petbe to the Greek god Cronus.
