= Litany of Re =

Ancient Egyptian funerary text of the New Kingdom of Egypt

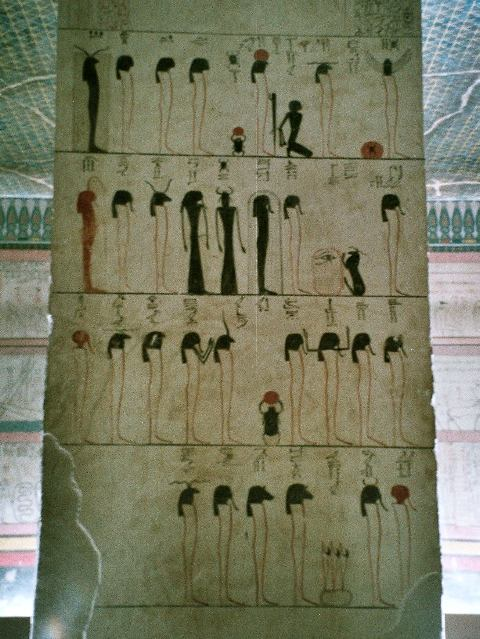
Litany of Re as depicted in KV34.

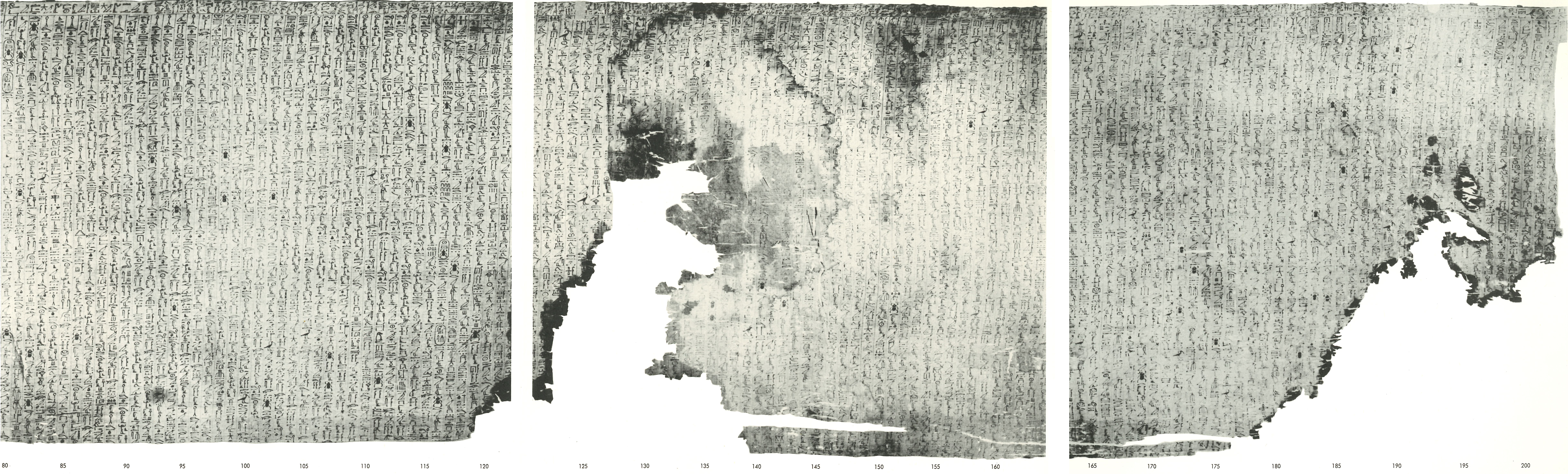
The complete text of the Litany of Re, as written on the linen burial shroud of Thutmose III.

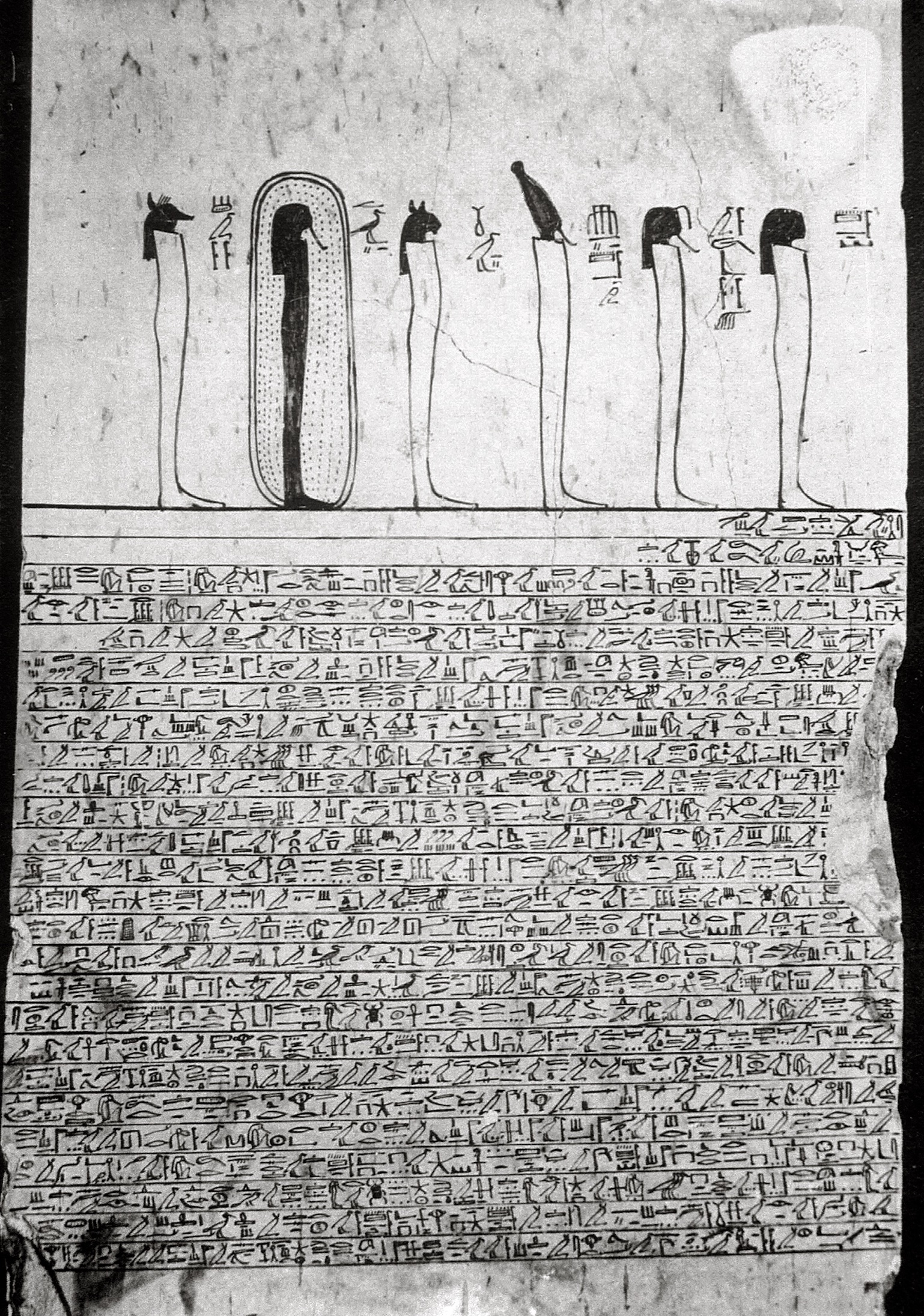
Figures from the Litany to Re, with the beginning of the Short Version of the Amduat below them.

The Litany of Re (or more fully "Book of Praying to Re in the West, Praying to the United One in the West") is an important ancient Egyptian funerary text of the New Kingdom. Like many funerary texts, it was written on the inside of the tomb for reference by the deceased. Unlike other funerary texts, however, it was reserved only for pharaohs or very favored nobility. It is a two-part composition that in the first part invokes the sun, Ra, in 75 different forms. The second part is a series of prayers in which the pharaoh assumes parts of nature and deities, but mostly of the sun god. Developed in the Eighteenth Dynasty, it also praises the king for his union with the sun god, as well as other deities. The text was used in the entrance of most tombs from the time of Seti I, though we first know of it from the burial chamber of Thutmose III and the tomb of his vizier Useramun.

== Gallery ==
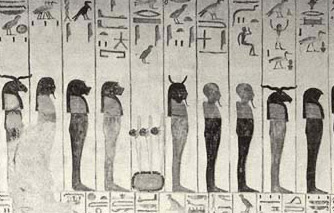

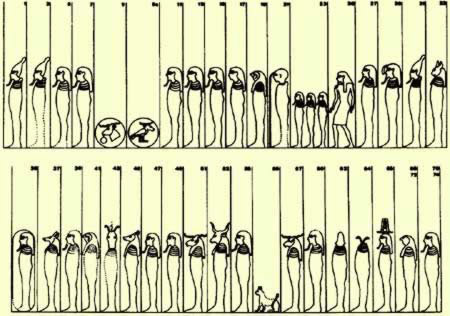

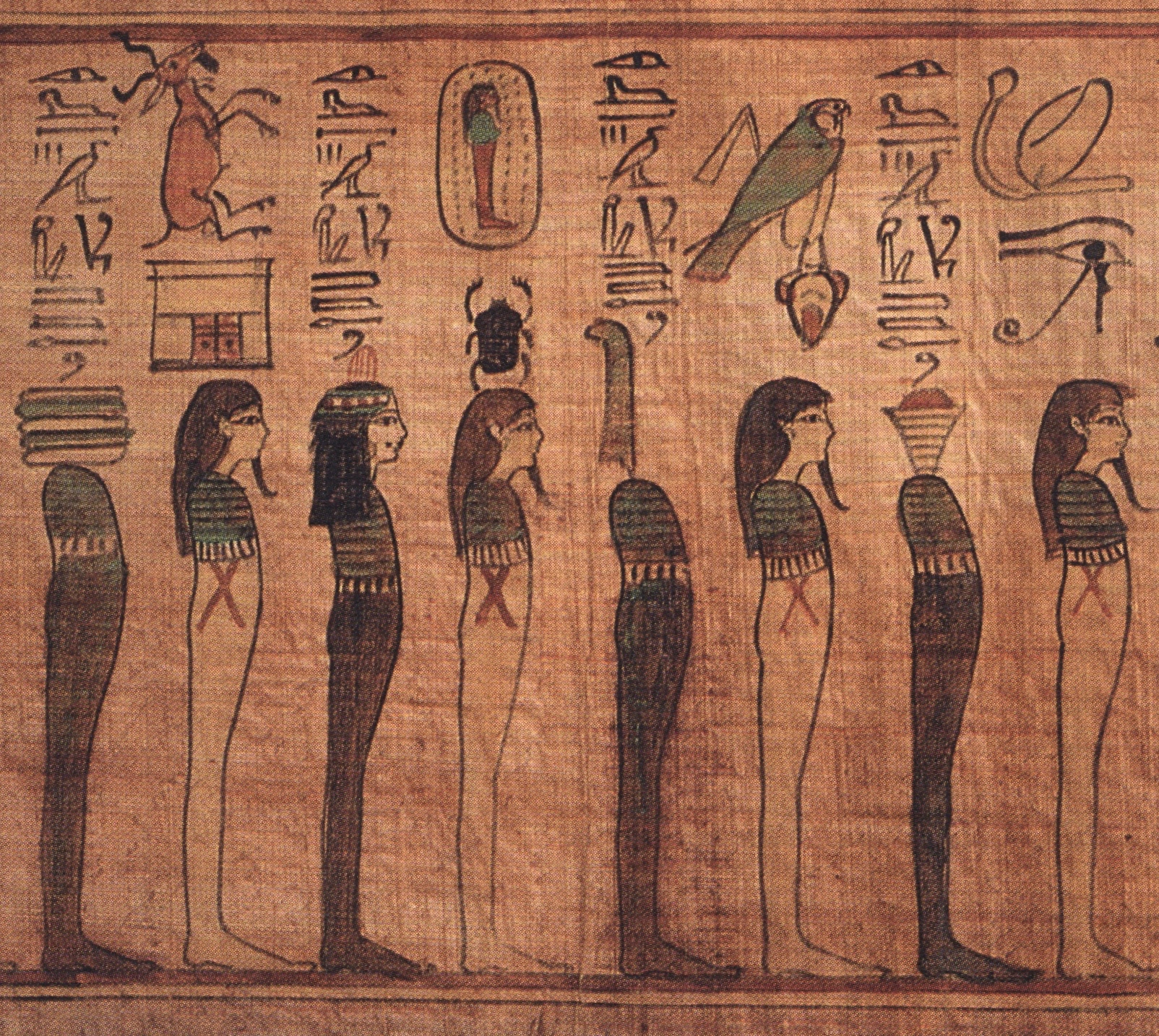

== See also ==
- Litany of the Eye of Horus
