= Aani =

Baboons in Ancient Egypt

The word for baboon in ancient Egyptian was jꜥnr, with later variants such as jꜥnj and jꜥnꜥ, rendered in the obsolete Lepsius romanization as respectively ȧāni and ȧānā. Attested over fifty times in extant literature, this word simply refers to the animal itself. In ancient Egyptian religion, the baboon was considered sacred to the Egyptian god Thoth. Many Egyptian gods can manifest in a baboon aspect or have other associations with the animal, including

- Hapy, a god who protects the canopic jar containing the lungs after embalming.
- Khonsu, a god known as “eater of hearts” in the Pyramid Texts.
- Thoth, a god of reason and writing: “And so the Baboon of Thoth came into being,” says one 18th Dynasty text.

Animal iconography does not imply the Egyptians identified the animals concerned as deities themselves. Rather, the animal could serve as an icon, or a large hieroglyph, representing a god. The Lexikon der ägyptischen Götter und Götterbezeichnungen also notes that a number of gods are given the epithet "the Baboon" in ancient Egyptian texts, including Osiris, Khonsu, and Thoth.
