= Duau (god) =

Ancient Egyptian moon god

Duau, the name of this ancient Egyptian moon god, also known as Dauau, is seen in the inscriptions found in the middle of the ancient Egyptian pyramid of Unas. He was worshipped as the patron deity of ophthalmologists of early Egypt.

== Historical importance ==
His popularity was in early Egypt. Archaeologists have found a number of inscriptions that say that many amongst the aristocrat society and priests of ancient Egypt were followers of Duau.

== Roles & worship ==
Although Duau began as a moon god, he later became the patron deity of the ophthalmologists of early Egypt.

In ancient Egypt, various eye diseases were often seen. At that time, if the ophthalmologists could not cure that, people would seek the help of Mesenty Irty, the god of the blind.
