= Gengen-Wer =

Egyptian goose deity

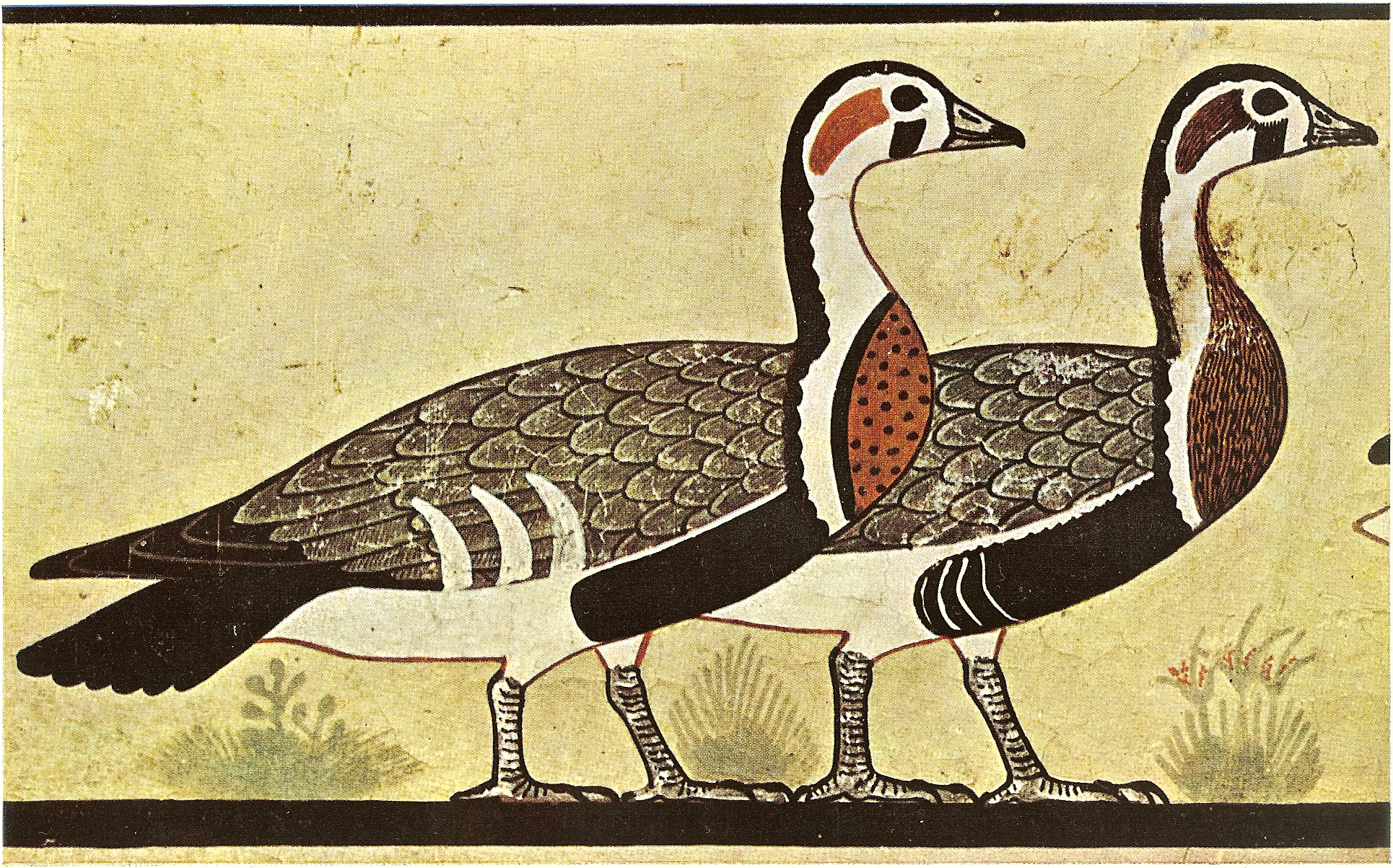
- Geese depicted in the tomb of Nefermaat
Name in hieroglyphs
n g g U19 wr

Gengen-Wer or Negeg-Wer (Ngg wr) is an Ancient Egyptian god of creation who appeared like a goose, possibly an Egyptian goose. His name can translate to great honker or great cackler. He is said to guard a celestial egg containing a powerful creative energy. He also played a minor role in one spell in Chapter 59 of the Book of the Dead.

== Works cited ==
- Wilkinson, Richard H. (2003). The Complete Gods and Goddesses of Ancient Egypt. Thames & Hudson. ISBN 0-500-05120-8.
