= Celestial Ferryman =

Ancient Egyptian deity

- Member of the Assessors of Maat
- drawing of the Celestial Ferryman based from the Papyrus of Ani
- Other names: Hraf-haf, Ma-haf
Name in hieroglyphs
Hr f Z1 HA A f or mA ir A HA A f

The Celestial Ferryman is the modern name of an Ancient Egyptian god. The god had multiple ancient names all with similar meanings, the two most common of which being Hraf-haf and Ma-haf which roughly translates to He whose face is behind him and He who sees behind him respectively.

== Mythology ==
The Celestial Ferryman played the role of a Psychopomp who helped guide souls through the waters of the underworld into the Field of Reeds, and was said to be rude and ill-tempered. The Celestial Ferryman was also one of the Assessors of Maat where was said to come from the "Cavern of Wrong" and judged the sin of copulating with a boy.

== Appearances ==
The first known mention of the Celestial Ferryman is in the Pyramid Texts of the Old Kingdom where he is called Ma-haf and a guard of Osiris, he later Appears in the Coffin Texts of the Middle Kingdom where he is once again called Ma-haf and guards Osiris.

The Celestial Ferryman is first physically depicted in the Book of the Dead of Ani, here he is drawn as a man sitting in a boat with his head facing backward, in accordant with his descriptive names

== Works cited ==
- Wilkinson, Richard H. (2003). The Complete Gods and Goddesses of Ancient Egypt. Thames & Hudson. ISBN 0-500-05120-8.
