= Perit (goddess) =

Underworld goddess in Egyptian mythology

Name in hieroglyphs
O1 D21 M17 M17 X1

Perit is an underworld deity in Egyptian mythology. She is one of the twelve goddesses in the ninth sector of Duat.

She utters words that give life and strength to Osiris.
