= Amu-Aa =

Ancient Egyption deity

Amu-Aa (also known as "eater of the ass/donkey", or "the one who knows the gate/door") (Note: Some translate the name as "one who knows the gate" which is a more fitting translation for his role as god near the gate.) is one of the gods that goes with Osiris during the second hour of the night.

Amu-Aa would eat the bread made for the boat and use the perfume.

While Amu can translate to Devourer and Aa to Donkey/Ass, Amu was also used in terms of knowledge like "To Know" and Aa also means door.
