= Am-heh =

Ancient Egyptian deity

- devourer of millions
Name in hieroglyphs
a m A2 C11 Z1
- Abode: Lake of fire

In Egyptian mythology, Am-heh was a minor god from the underworld, whose name means either "devourer of millions" or "eater of eternity". He was depicted as a man with the head of a hunting dog who lived in a lake of fire. He is sometimes seen as an aspect of Ammit, the personification of divine retribution. Am-heh could only be repelled by the god Atum.
