= Book of Traversing Eternity =

Ancient Egyptian funerary text

The Book of Traversing Eternity is an ancient Egyptian funerary text used primarily in the Roman period of Egyptian history (30 BC – AD 390). The earliest known copies date to the preceding Ptolemaic Period (332–30 BC), making it most likely that the book was composed at that time.

The book describes the deceased soul as visiting temples in Egypt and participating in the cycle of periodic religious rituals, particularly those related to the funerary god Osiris. Some scholars have seen the book's content as a description of the Duat, similar to the "underworld books" from the New Kingdom (c. 1550–1070 BC). Others, such as Jan Assmann, have argued that the book describes the deceased as joining with the religious community of the living. Erik Hornung says that in the Book of Traversing Eternity "the realm of the dead was brought into this life, and this other-worldly Egypt became the 'temple of the world', as it came to be called in late classical antiquity." Terence DuQuesne says that in the book "there is movement back and forth between places in Egypt and locations in the sky or in the netherworld… The text reads like a consecutive narrative, a magical mystery tour on different levels of reality."

Along with other funerary works, this text eventually superseded the Book of the Dead.

== See also ==
- Egyptian mythology (Origins)
- Eternity § Philosophy
