= Apshait =

Monster in Egyptian mythology

The Apshait is a monster in Egyptian mythology, described as a large flesh-eating beetle that eats corpses. It is mentioned in the Book of the Dead, under chapter 36.
