= Hemsut =

Egyptian goddesses of fate and protection

The Hemsut
Name in hieroglyphs
N41 G43 S29 X1
- Parents: Ptah

In Egyptian mythology, The ḥmswt (anglicized as Hemsut, Hemuset or Hemusut) were the goddesses of fate and protection. They are representative of the Ka (male protective spirit).

Hemsut are female counterparts to the Ka, providing nourishment, life force, power, and magical protection, especially to newborn royalty. The Hemsut images in art include a shield crossed with arrows, often worn as a headdress and sometimes appearing independently. The shield symbolizes the Sais Nome (Sap-Meh). Originally hemsut were closely associated with specific Kas, forming pairs (e.g., Hemsut of Hu, Hemsut of Heka), their concept probably expanded over time to include other deities.

== In popular culture ==
The Hemsut are briefly mentioned in The Prince of Egypt.

== Sources ==
- Bonnet, Hans, ed. (2000). "Hemsut". Lexikon der ägyptischen Religionsgeschichte [Lexicon of Egyptian Religious History] (in German) (3 ed.). Hamburg: Nikol. ISBN 3-937872-08-6.
- Lurker, Manfred (2015-04-29). "Ka". A Dictionary of Gods and Goddesses, Devils and Demons. Routledge. ISBN 978-1-136-10620-0.
- Ventker, Bettina (2018). Garanten der Herrschaft: Die Prozessionen der Kas und Hemusut in den Tempeln der griechisch-römischen Zeit [Guarantors of Rule: The Processions of the Kas and Hemusut in the Temples of the Greco-Roman Period]. Soubassementstudien VI. Studien zur spätägyptischen Religion (in German). Wiesbaden: Harrassowitz Verlag. ISBN 978-3-447-10883-6.
