= Panebtawy =

Egyptian deity

Name in hieroglyphs
p nb N16 N16 A17 p
- Major cult center: Kom Ombo
- Parents: Horus the Elder and Tasenetnofret

Panebtawy (Egyptian; pȝ nb tȝwy) is an Egyptian deity representing the Pharaoh as the son of Haroeris (Heru-ur). His name translates to “the lord of the two lands” representing the pharaoh as the legitimate ruler of all of Egypt. He is the divine son of Haroeris and Tasenetnofret in the Temple of Kom Ombo and he was depicted as a child with a hemhem crown.
