= Khenti-kheti =

Egyptian deity

- Khenti-kheti as a crocodile headed man with horns and a Pschent
Name in hieroglyphs
xnt t X t mzH or G5 xnt n t y X ti i i

Khenti-kheti could depicted as a crocodile-headed man with horns wearing a Pschent (left) or as a falcon-headed man wearing a sun-disk on his head and forward bull horns (right), there were many more forms he could also be depicted as.

In Egyptian mythology, Khenti-kheti (also spelt Chenti-cheti), was a crocodile-god, though he was later represented as a falcon-god. His name means "foremost retreater".

== Origin and evolution ==
At earlier times, he was the crocodile god of the region called Athribis in Lower Egypt. This is why, in Egyptian history, he has often been associated with Sebek and is said to be The Owner of Athribis. However, during the New Kingdom, he was shown to be related to Horus and was shaped like a hawk. At that time his name was Horas Khenti-Kheti.

== Legend ==
He could take the form of a giant black bull, named Kemwer. He was later replaced by Osiris, also known as "Osiris, who lived in Athribis".
