= Iat =

Egyptian goddess of milk and childbirth

- Goddess of milk
Name in hieroglyphs
i A t mwt
Symbol
R19

Iat (Ancient Egyptian: jꜣt) is an ancient Egyptian minor goddess of milk and, by association, of nurturing and childbirth.

The goddess is sparsely attested, and what little we know of her is based upon a handful of mentions in the Pyramid Texts. These include the following:

- utterance PT 211/Pyr. 131, where it is said of the deceased king, "My foster-mother is Iat, and it is she who nourishes me, it is indeed she who bore me" (unknown translator) or "The Milk-Goddess is his attendant. She is the one who will make it possible for him to live: she in fact is the one who bore Unis" (James P. Allen’s translation);
- utterance PT 578/Pyr. 1537, where the dead king is told to take on her identity in order to reach the gods in the retinue of the sun: "you should take hold of them, in your identity of the north wind; they will take account of you, in your identity of Anubis; and the gods will not go down against you, in your identity of the Milk-Goddess";
- and utterance MAFS PT 1071, which counsels, "Since you are little, you should give your arm to the Sun and sit with your arm to the Milk-Goddess."

== Etymology ==
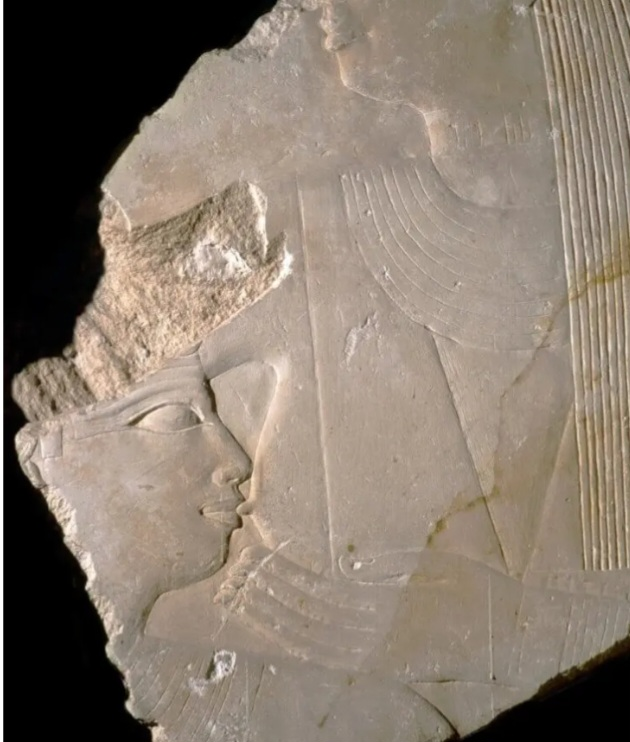
Pharaoh Unas being suckled by a goddess, possibly Iat, Egyptian Museum.

The name of the goddess resembles one Egyptian word for "milk", jꜣtt; the more common work for milk, jrṯt, may also have some etymological connection to both.

== See also ==
- Egyptian pantheon
