= Weneg (deity) =

Ancient Egyptian deity

Name in hieroglyphs
E34 N35 W11
- Parents: Ra

Weneg (also read as Uneg) was a sky and death deity from ancient Egyptian religion, who was said to protect the earth and her inhabitants against the arrival of the "great chaos".

== Mythology ==
The first known mention of a god named Weneg appears in a spell from the Pyramid Texts from the Sixth Dynasty, where he is described both as a death deity and as the deceased king. He is addressed as "Son of Ra". The texts contain several prayers asking that the king receive safe travel across the sky together with Ra in his celestial barque. The king is addressed by the name of Weneg.

PT 363; column 607c–d:
Ra comes, ferry the king over to yonder side,
as thou ferriest thy follower over,
the wng-plant, which thou lovest!

PT 476; column 952a–d:
O thou keeper of the way of the king, who art at the great gate,
certify the king to these two great and powerful gods,
for the king is indeed the wng-plant, the son of Ra,
which supports the sky, which governs the earth
and which will judge the gods!

Weneg as a deity is sparsely attested. He appears only in another Pyramid Texts spell from 6th Dynasty, where he is identified and equated with the sky god Shu. The name ‘Weneg’ as a such is otherwise known only as the name of a king from the Second Dynasty, whose chronological position and length of reign is uncertain.
