= Shepsy =

Ancient Egyptian deity

- Shepsy as a man wearing a moon disk
Name in hieroglyphs
Spsi s
- Major cult center: Hermopolis

Shepsy (also spelled Shepsi) was an Ancient Egyptian sun god worshiped in Hermopolis. He is believed to be either the son of or husband of Nehmetawy and was often depicted near Thoth. He was worshiped as far back as the Old Kingdom but became significantly more important during the 18th and 19th dynasty. Shepsy was usually depicted as a man wearing a sun disk or moon disk.
