= Min Festival =

Festival in ancient Egypt

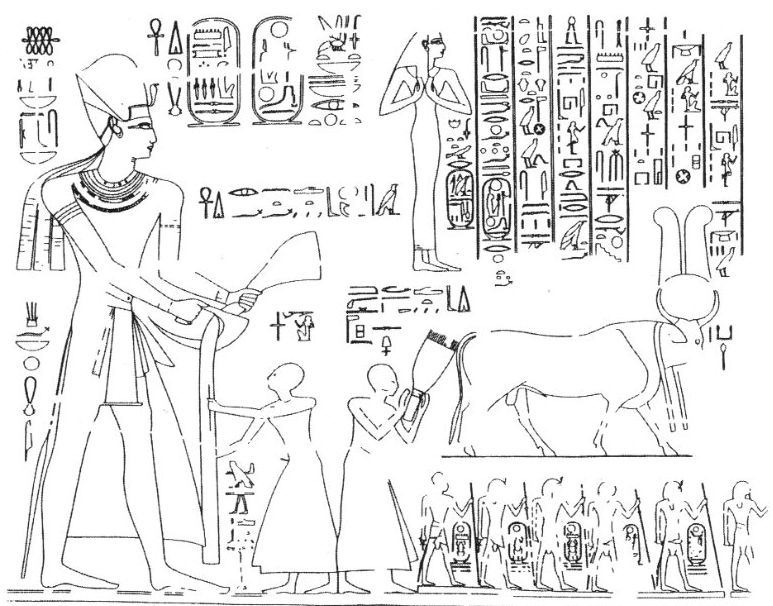
Depection of the Min Festival found in the temple of Ramses II

The Min festival was an ancient Egyptian ceremony that was held to celebrate the continued rule of a pharaoh. It dates back to Predynastic Egypt and was still very popular during the 19th Dynasty reign of Pharaoh Ramesses II. The festival was connected with the worship of the king and was held in the last month of the summer. It was carried out by the king himself, followed by his wife, royal family, and the court. When the king entered the sanctuary of the deity Min, he brought offerings and burning incense. Then, the standing god was carried out of the temple on a shield carried by twenty-two priests. In front of the statue of the god there were also two small seated statues of the pharaoh. In front of the god Min there was a large ceremonial procession that included dancers and priests. In front of them was a king with a white bull that was wearing a solar disc between its horns. When the god arrived at the end of the procession, he was given sacrificial offerings from the pharaoh. At the end of the festival, the pharaoh was given a bundle of cereal that symbolised fertility.

== Bibliography ==
- Ania Skliar, Grosse Kulturen der Welt - Ägypten, 2005
