= Rem (mythology) =

Ancient Egyptian deity

- Fish god
Name in hieroglyphs
D21 G17 D9 A40

Rem ("to weep"), also Rem-Rem, Remi, or Remi the Weeper, who lives in Rem-Rem, the realm of weeping, is a fish god in Egypt who fertilized the land with his tears, producing both vegetation and the reptiles. He is assumed to be the personification of Ra's tears.
