= Egyptian pool =

Water symbol used in ancient Egyptian hieroglyphic writing

N39
pool
in hieroglyphs

The pool (she) symbol in Egyptian mythology represents water. It is a rectangle, longer horizontally than vertically, with seven equally spaced vertical zigzag lines within it.

It can also represent the primal waters that the Egyptians believed was the source of all things, which they called Nun. Occasionally, the sun god is depicted as a sun arising from the pool symbol.

Egyptian pharaohs decreed that objects in paintings and the like should be instantly recognizable to the viewer. Hence, reflecting pools were shown from a bird's-eye view, even if the rest of the image was shown from the side.

== Bibliography ==
- Larsen, Laurie Sue (2018). Ma‘at’s Mysteries: The Roots of Renewal (PhD thesis). Pacifica Graduate Institute.
