= Ba-Pef =

Ancient Egyptian deity

Ba-pef
- Ba-pef as a ram-headed man with two knives
Name in hieroglyphs
R7 Z1 E10 p f

Ba-pef can be depicted as a ram-headed man (left) or a mummiform god with cow horns (right)

Ba-Pef was a minor underworld god in Egyptian mythology. The name literally means that Ba, meaning that soul (ba). Ba-Pef is commonly portrayed as an obscure malevolent deity known from the Old Kingdom. During the Old and Middle Kingdom the priesthood of Ba-Pef was held by queens.
