= Kebechet =

Ancient Egyptian goddess of embalming liquid

Name in hieroglyphs
W16 X1 I12 H6 R12 or q b H W16 w t D R12
- Symbol: Serpent
- Parents: Anubis

In Egyptian mythology, Kebechet (spelt in hieroglyphs as Qbḥt (Qebehet) and also transliterated as Khebhut, Kebehut, Qébéhout, Kabehchet and Kebehwet) is a goddess, a deification of embalming liquid. Her name means cooling water.

== Myths ==
Kebechet is a daughter of Anubis. In the Pyramid Texts, Kebechet is referred to as a serpent who "refreshes and purifies" the pharaoh.

Kebechet was thought to give water to the spirits of the dead while they waited for the mummification process to be complete. She was probably related to mummification where she would fortify the body against corruption, so it would stay fresh for reanimation by the deceased's ka.
