= Kneph =

Ancient Egyptian god and motif

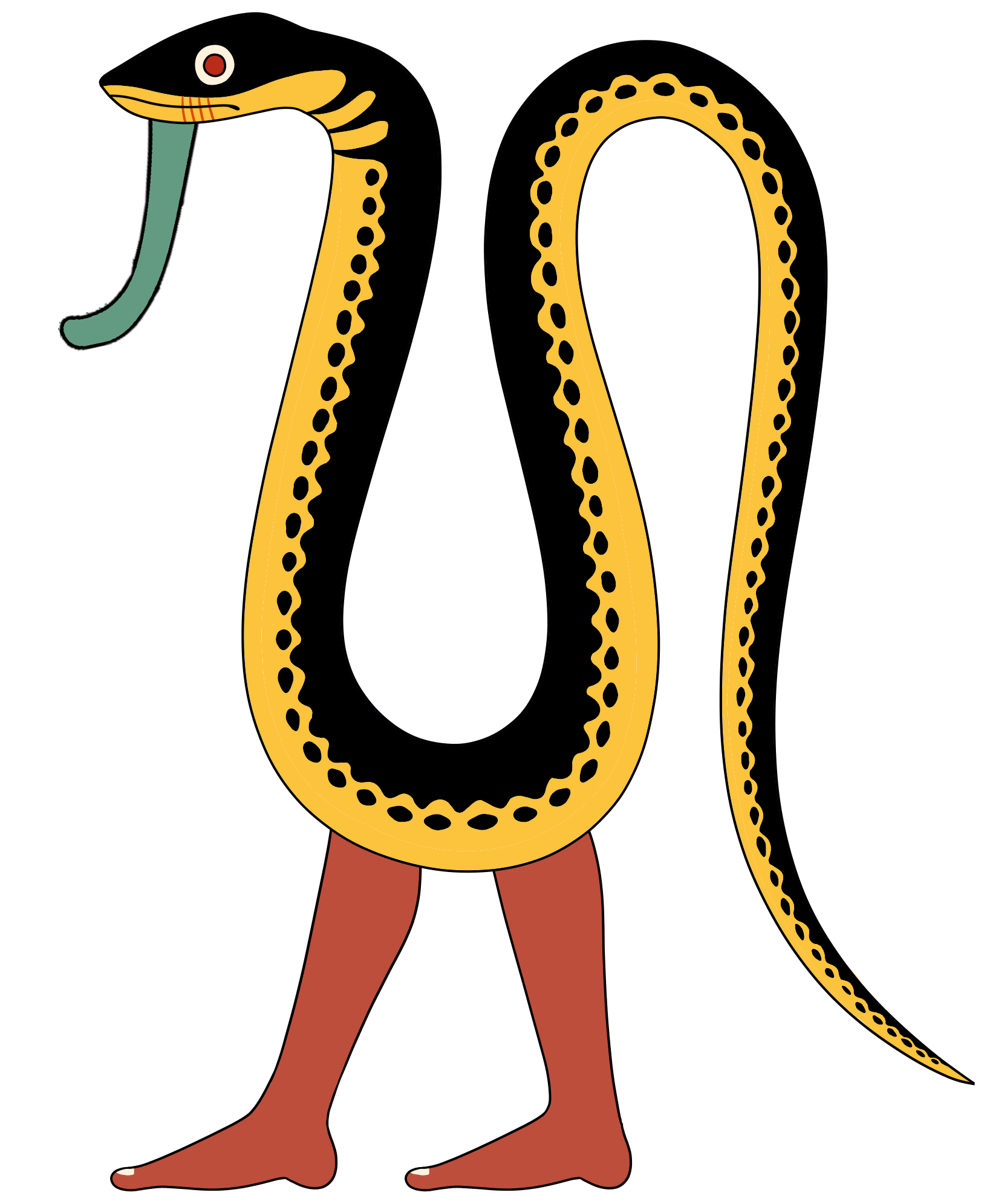

Kneph, also as Kmeph, is a god and motif of divinity in ancient Egyptian religious art, variously represented as a winged egg, a globe surrounded by one or more serpents, or Amun in the form of a serpent called Kematef. Some Theosophical sources tried to syncretize this motif with the deity Khnum, along with Agathos Daimon, Serapis and Pluto. Under the Greek theonym Chnuphis, this figure adopts a serpent-bodied, lion-headed ("leontoeidic") visage, being particularly common in magical artifacts in Late Antiquity. It is by proxy frequently associated with the Gnostic Demiurge.
