= Litany of the Eye of Horus =

Ancient Egyptian text

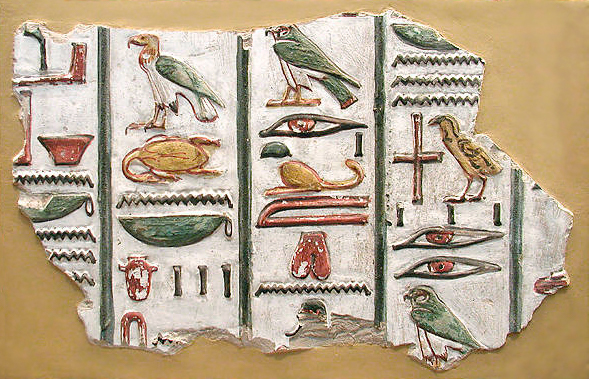
The Litany of the Eye of Horus, 5 vertical registers of a wall relief section from KV17, Tomb of Seti I, corridor H, Valley of the Kings. (H24.5 cm, W38.4 cm, D12.3 cm.

The Litany of the Eye of Horus is an ancient Egyptian text in the style of a funerary text, (offering formula). A small portion of the text is contained in a limestone wall relief fragment of painted hieroglyphs located in the British Museum (no. EA 5610).

The painted hieroglyphs for the relief segment in the tomb of the 19th Dynasty pharaoh Seti I are also carved in low raised relief.

== The Litany of the Eye of Horus ==
The Litany of the Eye of Horus is a Middle Egyptian offering liturgy.

== See also ==
- Book of the Dead
