= Spell of the Twelve Caves =

Ancient Egyptian funerary text

The Spell of the Twelve Caves (also called the Wandering of the Soul; Arabic: تعويذة الكهوف الاثني عشر, romanized: Taewidhat al-Kuhuf al-Iathnay Eashar) is an ancient Egyptian funerary text from the New Kingdom. The earliest known copy is on a papyrus found in KV35 the tomb of Amenhotep II, and another copy was inscribed in the Osireion at Abydos under Merenptah. Although the text also appears in some copies of the Book of the Dead, where it is classified as Spell 168, the Egyptologist Alexandre Piankoff treated it as a distinct composition.

The text describes the Duat, or underworld, as a realm divided into twelve caves, much like the twelve hours found in the Amduat and the Book of Gates, two other funerary texts from the early New Kingdom. Each cave is described as containing several groups of deities who grant benefits to the soul of a deceased person, such as enabling the deceased to move freely through the afterlife.

== Bibliography ==
- Hornung, Erik (1999). The Ancient Egyptian Books of the Afterlife (in German). David Lorton (translator). Cornell University Press.
