= Wepset =

Ancient Egyptian deity

Name in hieroglyphs
wp p s Q7 t H8

Wepset (wps.t) is an ancient Egyptian goddess. She is one of the personifications of the uraeus cobra that protected the kings; she is also an Eye of Ra and is mentioned as "the Eye" in the Coffin Texts. Her name means "she who burns". In New Kingdom texts she destroys the enemies of Osiris. She was mentioned as having a temple on the island of Biga; no such structure has been found there, but she appears in the temples of other deities here and in Lower Nubia.

== Iconography ==
She is most often depicted as a snake, but in the Greek and Roman period she also has anthropomorphic depictions, as a woman with a lion's head or with uraeus or sun disk on her head.

== See also ==
- Seraph – Type of angel in Abrahamic religions
- Nesret – Wepset's partner
