= Ruty =

Ancient Egyptian lion god

- Twin lions guarding the eastern and western horizons as the points where the sun touches the twin-peaked mountain top of the earth where it leaves and re-enters the underworld, Aker was also often depicted like this
Name in hieroglyphs
t Z1 Z1 l l
- Symbol: Horizon, lion

Ruty was an ancient Egyptian god. He was commonly depicted as two lions sejant facing away from each other, with the sign for Horizon placed on their backs. Ruty could also appear as a man with a lion’s head.

== Citations ==
- Wilkinson, Richard H. (2003). The Complete Gods and Goddesses of Ancient Egypt. Thames & Hudson. ISBN 0-500-05120-8.
