= Peteese and Pihor =

Deified brothers in Egyptian mythology

- Drawing of Peteese and Pihor
- Major cult center: Dendur

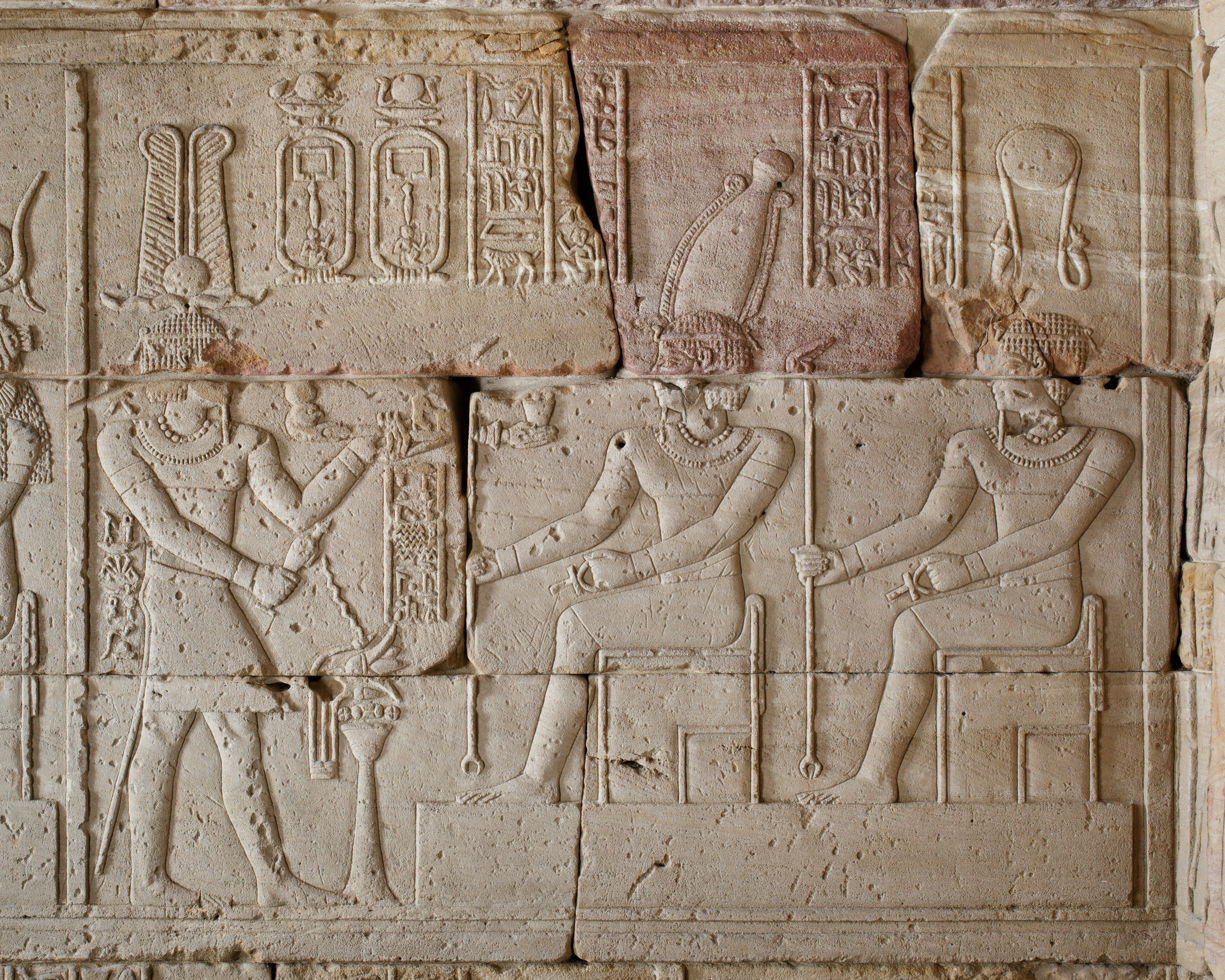
Relief of Peteese and Pihor

Peteese and Pihor were two brothers from lower Nubia who were believed to have drowned in the Nile River and became minor gods during the 26th dynasty. During the reign of Augustus, who in addition to being Emperor of Rome was also Pharaoh while in Egypt, a temple to the brothers and Isis was built in Dendur. Today, the Temple of Dendur has been relocated to the Metropolitan Museum of Art due to fears of it flooding as a result of the construction of the Aswan Dam.

The name of Peteese translates to "he whom Isis has given" and, Pihor translates to "he who belongs to Horus."

== See also ==
- Media related to Peteese and Pihor at Wikimedia Commons

== Works cited ==
- Wilkinson, Richard H. (2003). The Complete Gods and Goddesses of Ancient Egypt. Thames & Hudson. ISBN 0-500-05120-8.
