= Abtu =

Name of a sacred fish in Egyptian mythology

- a digital drawing of abtu
Name in hieroglyphs
U23 D58 N26 O49

Abtu (Ancient Egyptian: ꜣbḏw) is the name of a sacred fish, according to Egyptian mythology, and of the city of Abydos, the place where Osiris and the early rulers of Egypt were buried.

== Abtu as word ==
Abtu was also the ancient word for the western or west of something. This was then understood as the place where the days passage of the sun across the sky finishes so for ancient Egypt where the sun dies each day and passes into the dark underworld.

== Abtu as fish ==
Evidence of Abtu being known as a sacred fish here is taken from “A Hymn Of Praise To Ra When He Riseth In The Eastern Part Of Heaven” as translated by Robert Guisepi (1984):

“Let me behold the Abtu Fish at his season.”

Furthermore, the goddess Isis is said to have transformed into the Abtu, perhaps therefore lending to the creature its sacred state. Isis, as 'Abtu, Great Fish of the Abyss,' was identified with the penis-swallower of the Osiris in the legend of Osiris within the city of Oxyrhynchus, and named the city after the sacred fish (Oxyrhynchus means "sharp nosed fish"). The fish cult spread to many parts of Egypt.

== Abtu in myth ==
The mythological Abtu also was known to accompany or tow the barque of Ra across the sky at sunrise.
