= Christian Leitz =

German archaeologist and Egyptologist (born 1960)

Christian Leitz (born 7 August 1960) is a German Egyptologist.

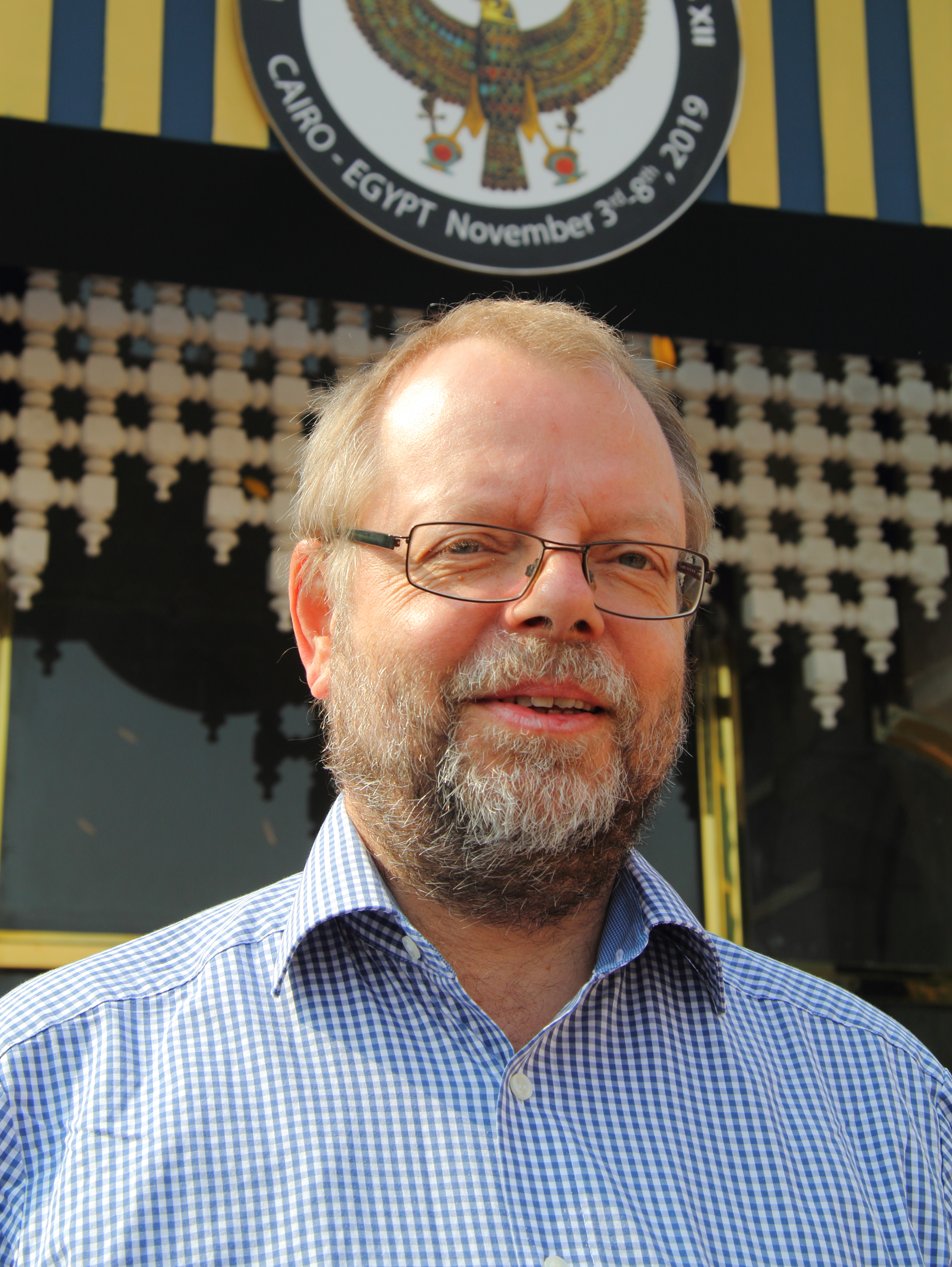
Christian Leitz in Cairo 2019

Leitz was born in Borghorst, Westphalia, Germany.

He studied Egyptology, Assyriology and Coptology at the universities in Marburg and Göttingen and received his PhD in Göttingen in 1989. In 1993, he was habilitated at the University of Cologne where he also held a Heisenberg scholarship from the Deutsche Forschungsgemeinschaft (DFG, German Research Foundation) from 1993 to 1998. From 1999 to 2003, he led the project „Lexikon der ägyptischen Götter und Götterbezeichnungen“ ("Lexicon of Egyptian Gods and Names of Gods") at the Seminar for Egyptology in Cologne. Since 1 April 2004, he has been a full professor of Egyptology at the University of Tübingen. During this time, he taught as a visiting professor at the École Pratique des Hautes Études in Paris in January/February 2007, at the Collège de France in Paris in November 2009 and at Cairo University in March/April 2013.

Currently, his most important research project is the Athribis Project. The objective of the project is to fully and thoroughly research, preserve and publish the written records, material technologies and architectural history of the large temple in the ancient city of Athribis which was dedicated to the god Min-Re, his wife Repyt and their son, the child-god Kolanthes. The archaeological site is located near the modern Middle Egyptian city of Sohag.

== Publications ==
- Studien zur ägyptischen Astronomie. Harrassowitz, Wiesbaden 1991, ISBN 3-447-03157-3 (dissertation)
- Tagewählerei: Das Buch ḥ3t nḥḥ pḥ.wy ḏt und verwandte Texte. Harrassowitz, Wiesbaden 1994, ISBN 3-447-03515-3 (habilitation thesis)
- Altägyptische Sternuhren. Peeters, Leuven 1995, ISBN 9-0683-1669-9
- Die Außenwand des Sanktuars in Dendara – Untersuchungen zur Dekorationssystematik. Münchner Ägyptologische Studien, Nr. 50. Mainz 2001
- Quellentexte zur ägyptischen Religion I. Die Tempelinschriften der griechisch-römischen Zeit. LIT, Münster 2004, ISBN 3-8258-7340-4
