= Athribis Project =

Archaeological project in Egypt

The Athribis Project is an archaeological and philological endeavour investigating the ruins of the Pharaonic and later Coptic Christian community of the Ancient Egyptian town of Athribis, near to the modern city of Sohag, Egypt. The aim of the project is to fully and thoroughly research, preserve and publish the written records, material technologies and phases of construction of the large temple in the town, which was dedicated to the god Min-Re, his wife Repyt and their son, the child-god Kolanthes.

A team of Egyptologists, conservationists and architectural experts from Germany, Poland and Egypt have been working on the project since 2003, under the leadership of Christian Leitz, professor of Egyptology at Tübingen University.

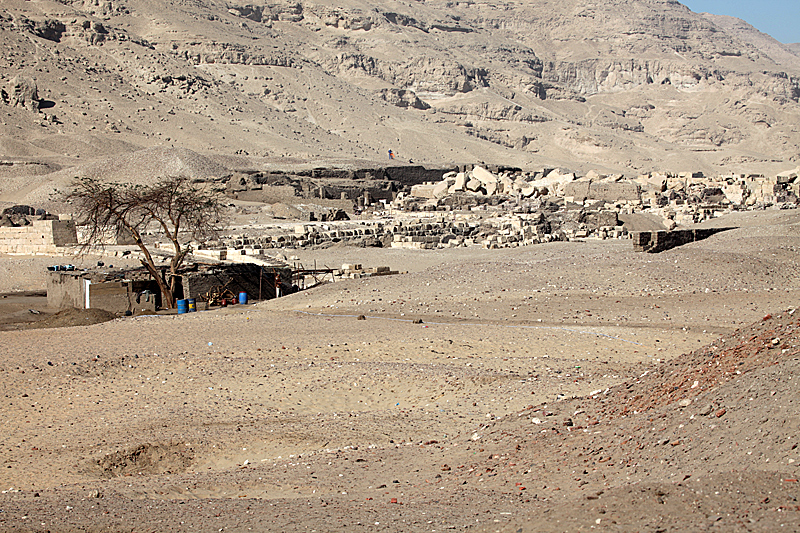
Archaeological site of Athribis, view to the north-west, el-Sheikh Hamad, governorate of Sohag, Egypt

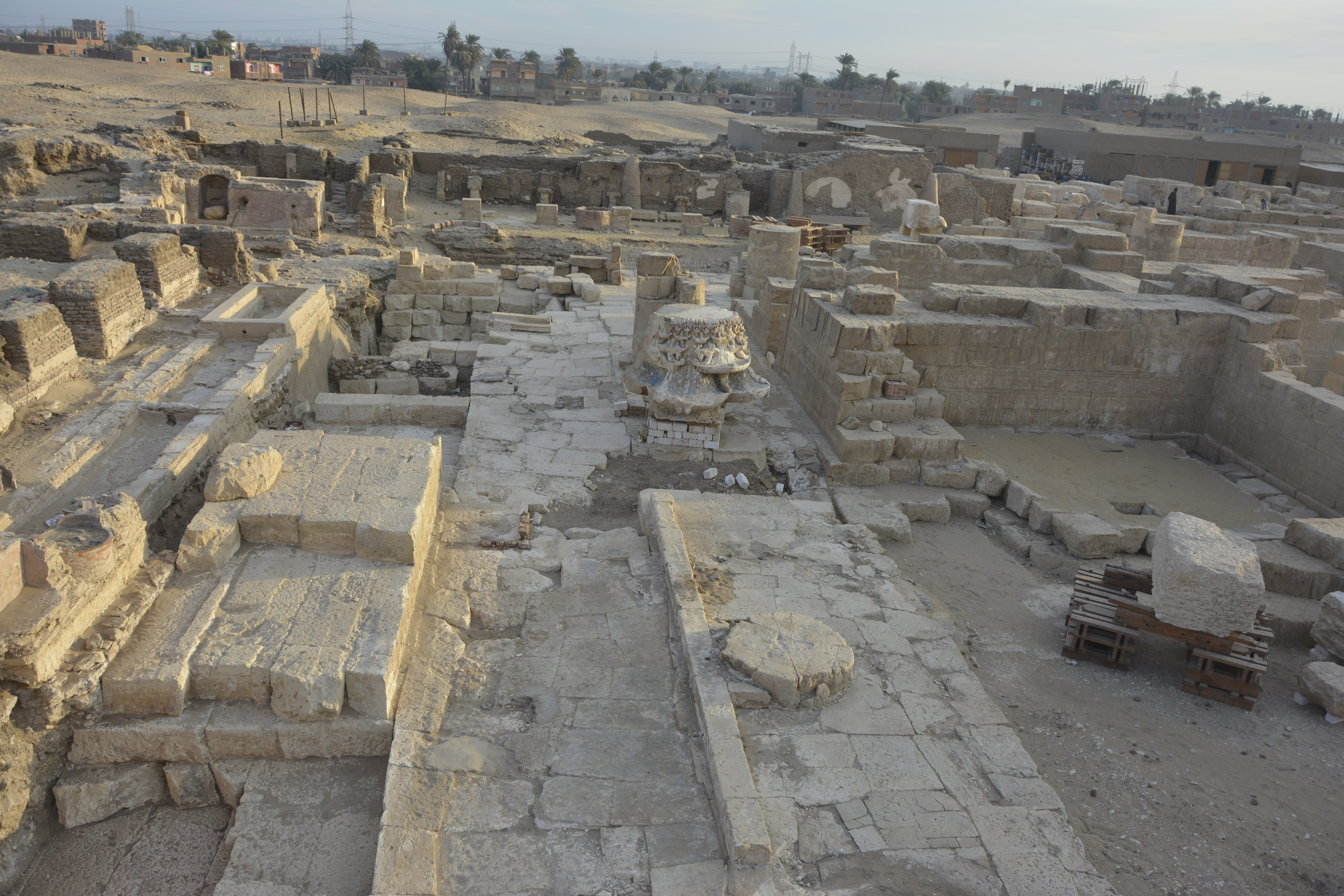
Room L2 as seen from above in the Athribis temple in Sohag, Egypt

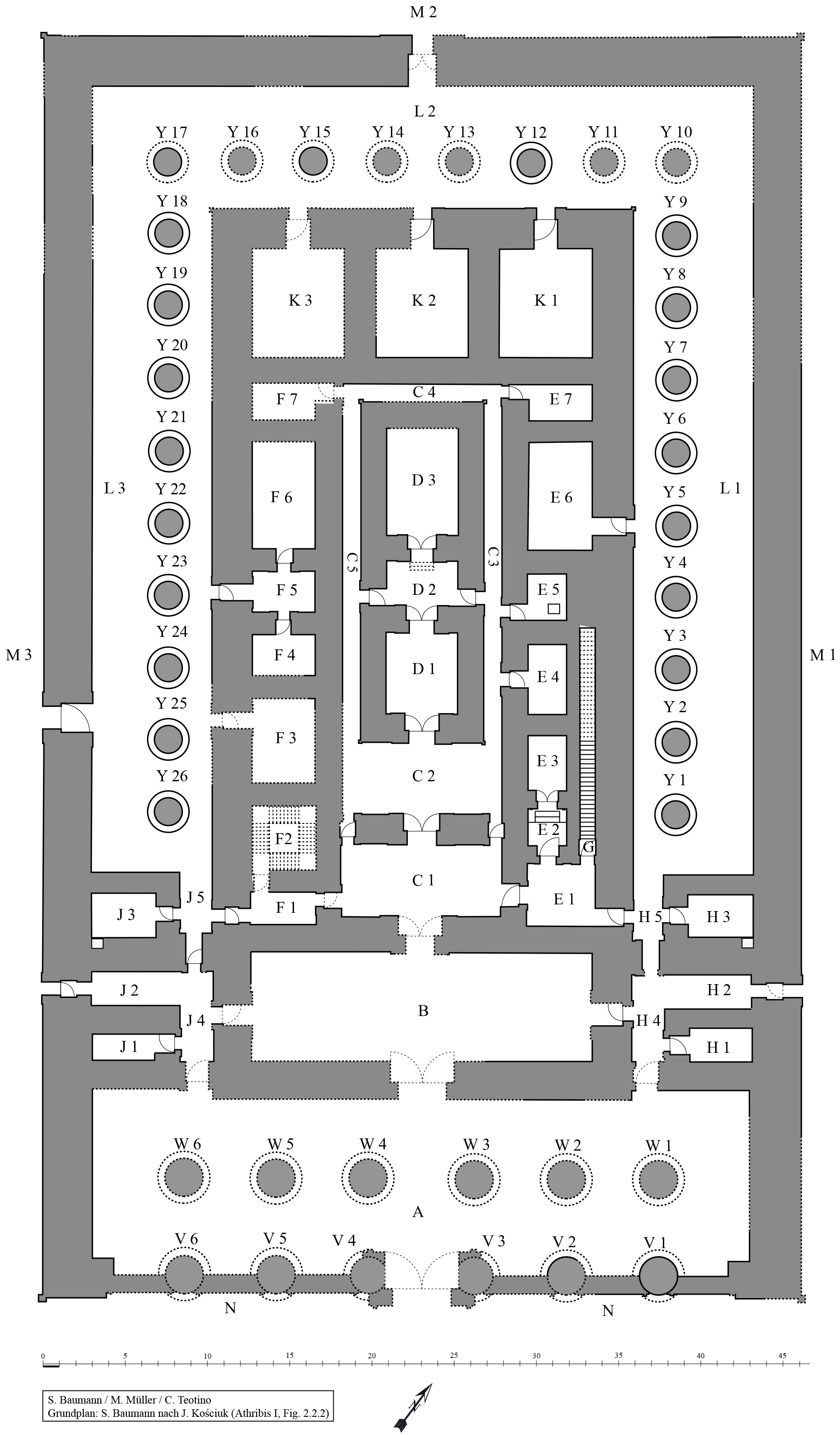
Ground floor of the Min-Re temple

== Geographical location ==
Athribis is located about 7 kilometres or 4 miles southwest of the modern city of Sohag (about 200 km or 125 mi north of Luxor), at the foot of the mountains on the west bank of the Nile. This area would have been part of the 9th Upper Egyptian nome of Ancient Egypt, whose capital was at Achmim, directly opposite Athribis on the east bank of the Nile. The archaeological site stretches over more than 30 hectares which for the most part remains unexcavated and consists of the temple complex, a settlement, the necropolis and quarries. The temple currently being excavated measures 75 by 45 metres, while the other of the two temples is still buried underneath the sand.

== Archaeologigcal activity ==
Early find-collecting expeditions to Athribis were made by John Gardner Wilkinson (in 1825), Nestor l'Hôte (1839) and the Prussian Expedition led by Karl Richard Lepsius (1845). However the first archaeologist to examine the temple complex was Flinders Petrie. For 6 weeks in 1906/1907 he excavated the main temple as part of the activity led by the British School of Archaeology in Egypt (BSAE). His aim was to draw up a floor plan of the temple layout, which he managed even in such a short time, and his findings were published in the Reports of the BSAE. After his excavations, Petrie reburied the temple to preserve it against various potential environmental damages.

After that, the Supreme Council of Antiquities conducted researched in the main temple from 1981 to 1996, however they only excavated two thirds of the temple and left the rest untouched.

The current Athribis Project began in 2003 under the leadership of Christian Leitz, professor of Egyptology at Tübingen University. The biggest challenge at that time was dealing with approximately 400 collapsed stone blocks, weighing up to 34 tonnes, which had to be removed with specialised inflatable air pads like those used at Sheikh Abd el-Qurna near Luxor. Once these had been retrieved, the excavation could begin in earnest in 2012. The blocks are now stored near the temple and are being studied there.

An important part of the work is the documentation and appraisal of the large collection of texts found in relief on the stones which make up walls, columns and roofs. There are about 1,300 different inscriptions, many of which are completely new to modern Egyptology, having no counterpart in any other temple and which are very enlightening about Late Egyptian religion. One of the most important of these is an inscription to the god Min in the east colonnade. It consists of 110 lines of text along a 21 metre long stretch of wall, and is significantly better preserved than any other older version of this text from the 19th or 20th dynasties that has been found.

Since 2015 a team from Yale University has been excavating a portion of the cloisters of the Coptic Christian nunnery that surrounds the main temple.

== Financial support ==
The project was initially supported by the Fritz-Thyssen-Stiftung from 2003 to 2004. Since 2005, the project has been generously supported by the Deutsche Forschungsgemeinschaft (DFG).

== Historical classification of finds ==
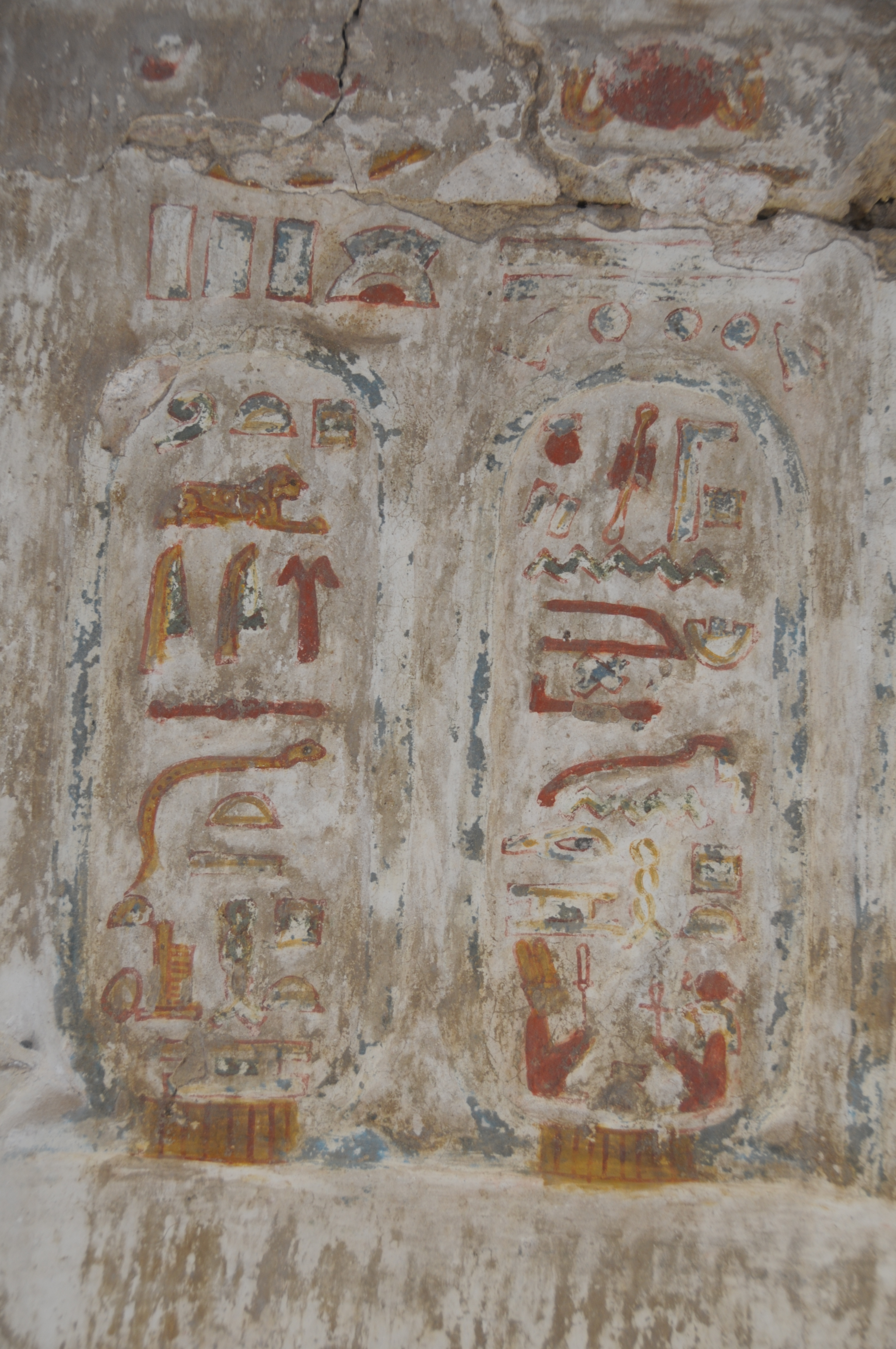
Cartouche of king Ptolemy XII (room E3) in the Athribis temple

The period of building and decoration in the temple spans more than 200 years. Ptolemy XII (ruled 81–58 and 55–51 BC), one of the last kings of the Ptolemaic dynasty and father of Cleopatra VII, built the 75m by 45m temple and decorated the interior rooms.

The decoration of outer walls and pillars surrounding this however date to the reigns of Tiberius (14–37 AD), Caligula (37–41 AD) and Claudius (41–54 AD). Their names have been found in inscriptions in the form of traditional Ancient Egyptian titulary.

Vespasian (69–79 AD), Titus (79–81 AD) and Domitian (81–96 AD) are also mentioned in short texts, and beyond this even the name of Hadrian (117–138 BC) has been discovered on a limestone block, but it is not clear whether this belongs to the main temple or not.

After this original usage, a Christian nunnery was built around the old temple. This happened at latest soon after the ban of pagan cults, in an edict brought into effect by the Roman Emperors Theodosius I, Gratian and Valentinian II in the year 380 BC. Some rooms in the temple were re-purposed as workshops, used for example for dyeing textiles (rooms C1 and C2). In some areas built-in and buried storage vessels have been found (for example in room D3) and some rooms housed stalls for animals or pottery kilns. In addition a church was built opposite the temple entrance.

After the muslim conquest of Egypt in 642 the nunnery was slowly deserted and the temple rooms turned mainly into rubbish dumps. From this time sherds of pottery and glass have been found, along with remains of mats, baskets, textiles, tools and jewellery, and writing on ostraka and papyrus rags. Many rooms were also used as pens for sheep and goats, a deduction arrived at due to the large concentration of excrement in certain layers of excavation. In the Late Roman period two mud-brick pens were built in the courtyard M3 and a bread oven in room L1. The remains of other fires can be seen and peeling walls in rooms E6 and J2 signify damage from a large fire.

In the following centuries the temple was filled with collapsing stones and other debris, in some places up to a depth of 3 metres. In addition, mounds of countless limestone sherds have been uncovered, the result of destruction the middle ages. Collapsed stones were re-carved where they fell and split up to be used in other places, indicated by the fragments of reliefs with many traces of colour still visible. The removal of building material in this way did not proceed constantly, according to the finds in different layers of the excavation. It seems that material from the temple was only re-purposed when it was needed.

== Structure of the temple ==
The hexastyle facade in forecourt (A), was in antiquity made up of now destroyed Hathor pillars, which each featured four faces of Hathor looking towards each of the four cardinal directions. They were originally joined with screen walls but nowadays little of these two-storey pillars remain. The room behind this forecourt (room B) ought to have been the Hypostyle, but recent excavations have found no traces of pillars in the room. The room for sacrifices (C1) is once more behind that, and extant decoration within shows the bull god Mnevis who attended to the altar. Behind that is located the Hall of the Ennead (C2), which stands in front of three further central rooms (D1-D3) which could each be associated with one of the Triad of gods to whom the temple is dedicated. However it could also be the case that these are, as is usual in so-called birth houses (like Mammisi), two different rooms with the other being a sanctuary (D3). This interpretation could work, based on the dating of room D3 to the ptolemaic period. The rooms are surrounded by further smaller chapels providing for all manner of functions. In the materials store (E4) cloths and oils were stored for ceremonies. One inscription from this room (E4, 3, 1, and 4) describes:

…he (that is, Ptolemy XII) built this wonderful memorial for his father Min Re, the lord of Achmim, the king of the gods. He built the materials store for his mother, the Mighty, Repyt, the Eye of Horus in the West, in order to beautify her majesty with these fabrics. May the reward for the King be that duration, that life and power, that full health and all joy which eternally comes forth from the throne of Horus like Ra (the sun god).

In the Punt Chamber and the so-called Chamber of the Gods’ Land are depictions of incense and myrrh trees, the only place such images yet have been found from the whole of Ancient Egypt. The accompanying texts describe how to extract the myrrh, incense, oil and wood from the different trees and evaluates the relative quality, consistence, smell and place of origin of each one, in addition to describing their use and much more. The Punt Chamber and the neighbouring rooms F4 and F5 make up the Laboratory. These rooms are described in an inscription as follows:

…he (that is, Ptolemy XII) built the Punt Chamber, fully adorned with the myrrh trees, for his mother, the Mighty, the Eye of Horus, Repyt in the West. He supplied the Laboratory with countless large and sweet-smelling timbers for his father (that is, the god Min-Re)…

Another peculiarity of the temple is group of three north-facing chapels K1-K3. Together with the rooms D1-D3, E and F they are surrounded by a walkway (L1-L3) with pillars in the shape of plants (Y1-Y26).

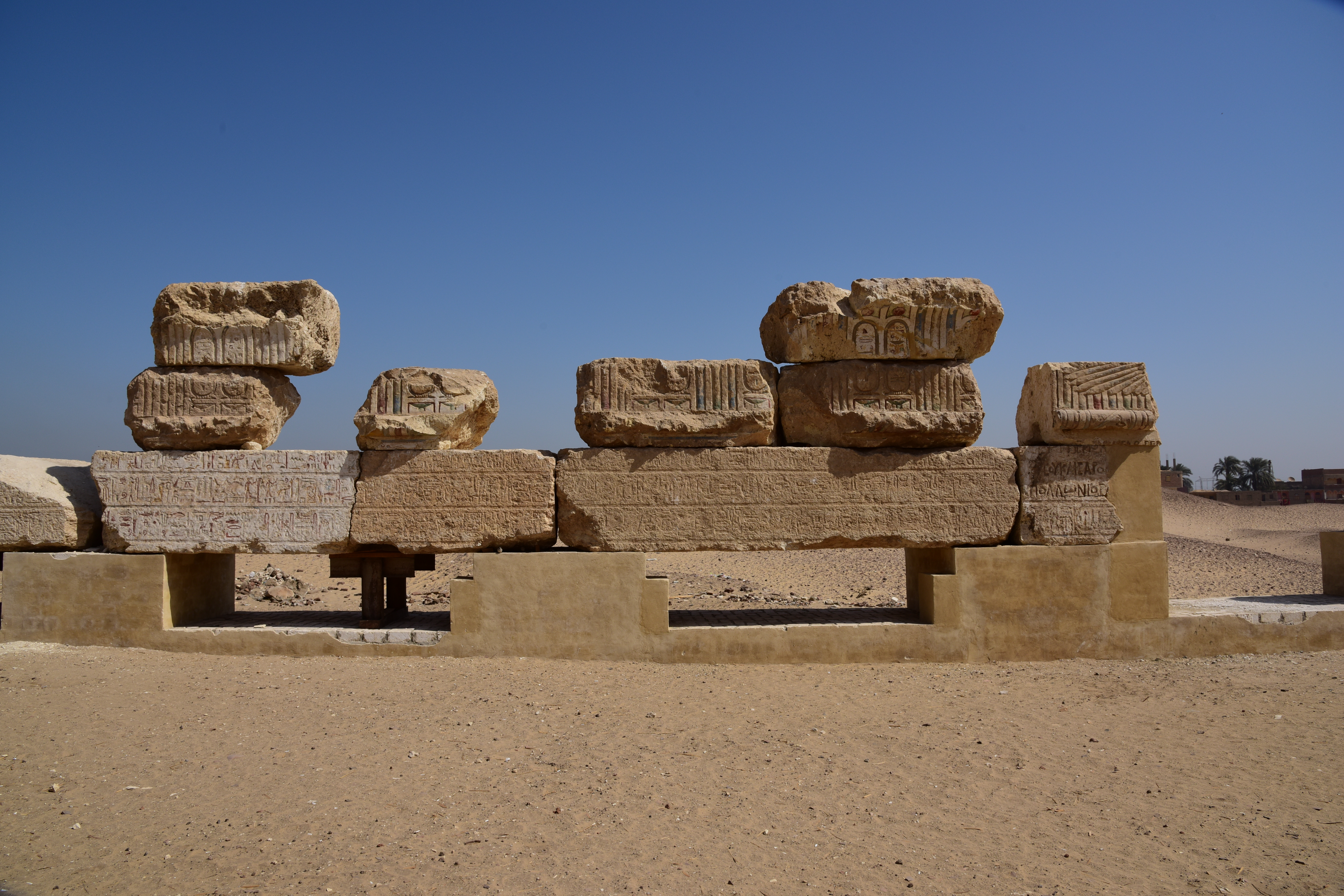
Pronaos (A)

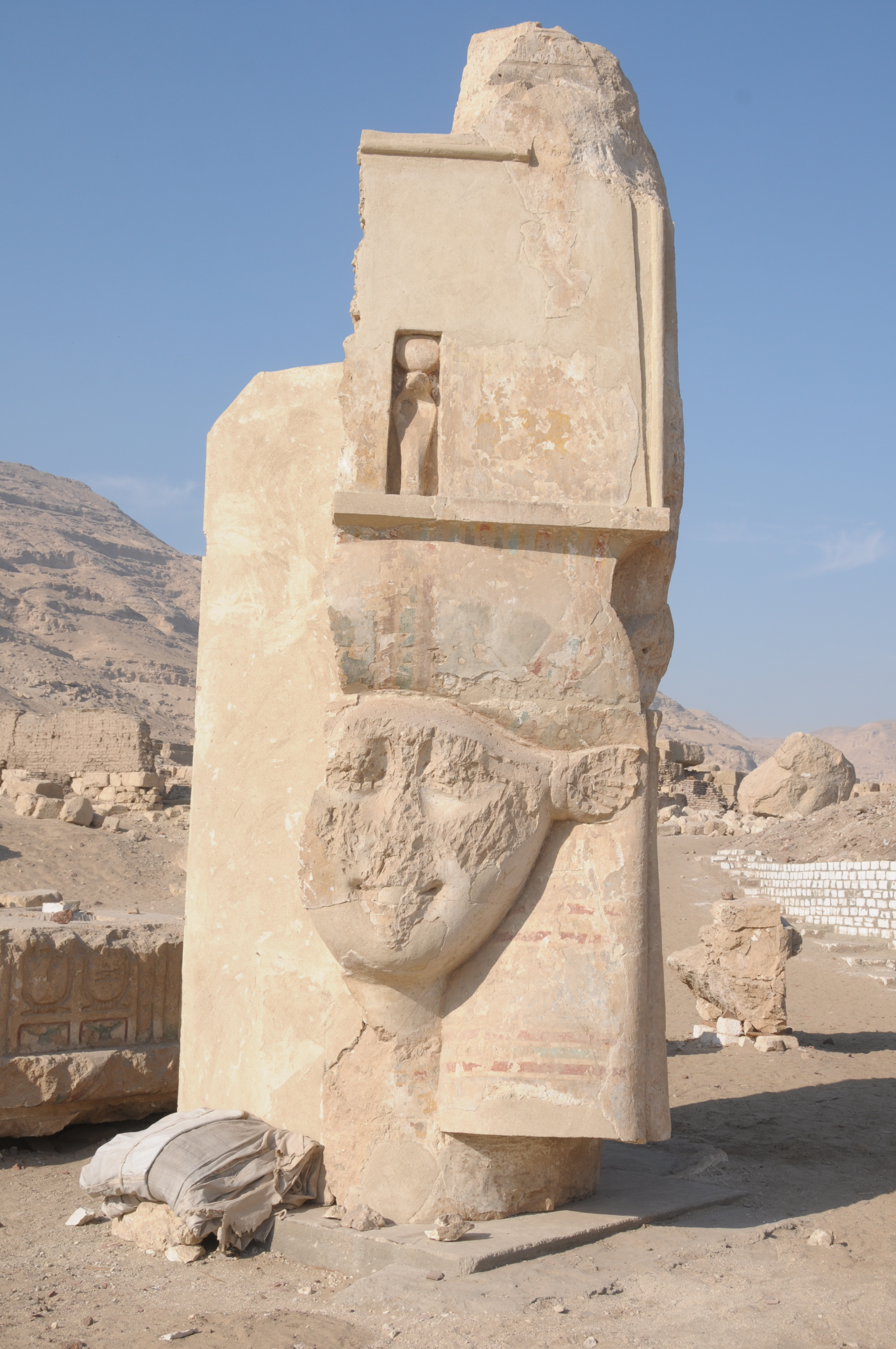
Face of the goddess Hathor on a pillar in the pronaos (room A)

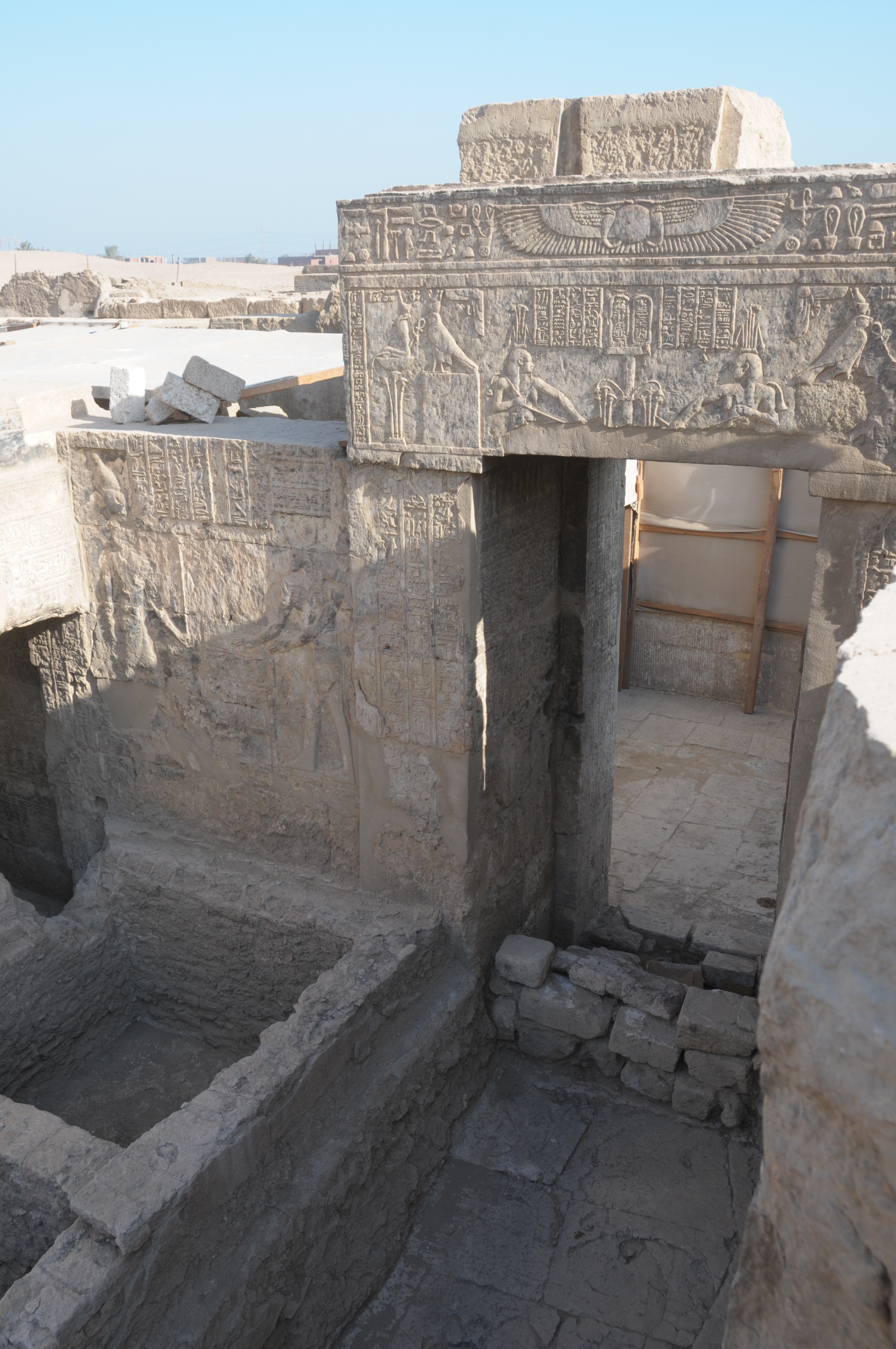
Door (inner side) towards E1 (room C1 sacrificial hall)

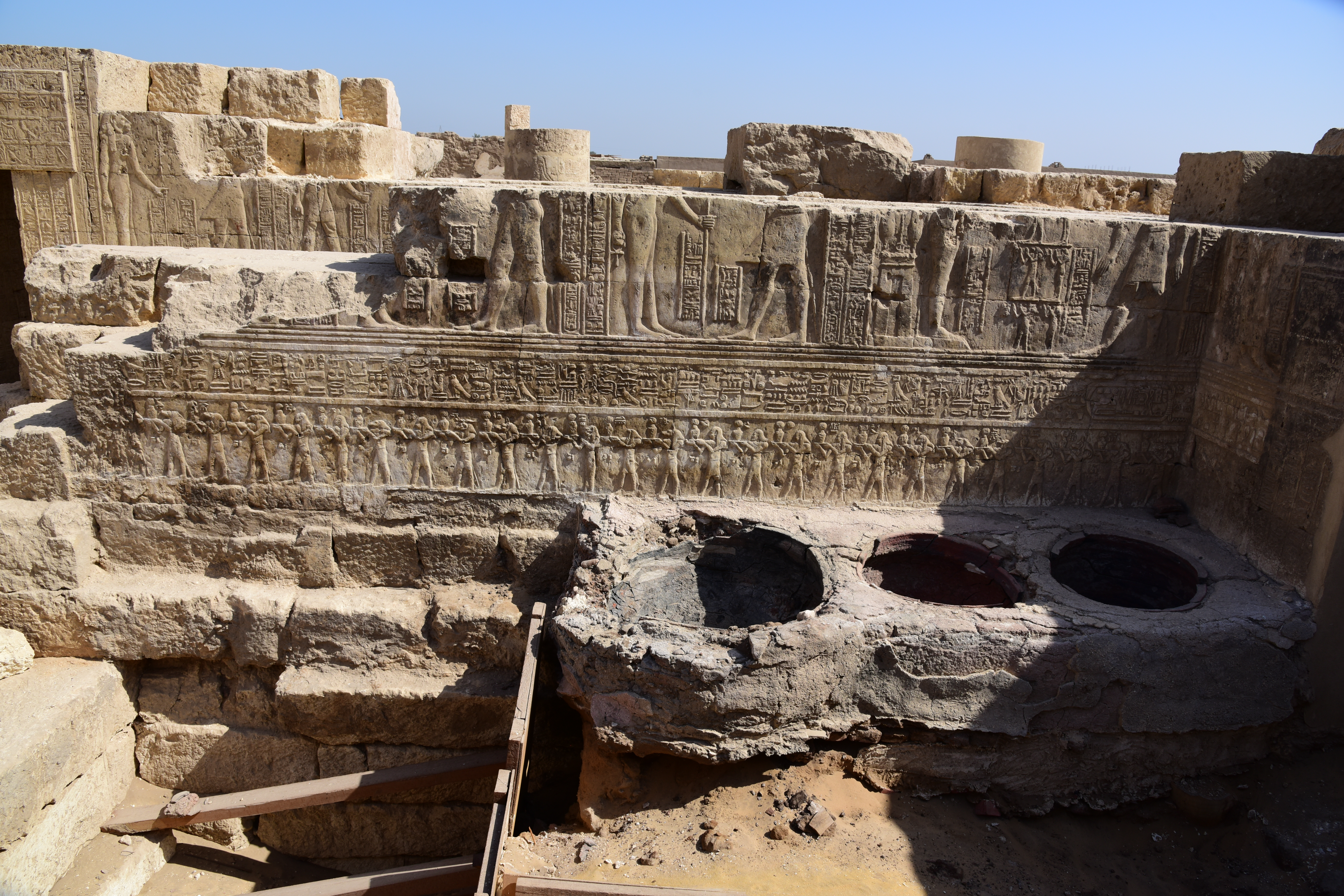
Room D3 with immured and sunken storage vessels

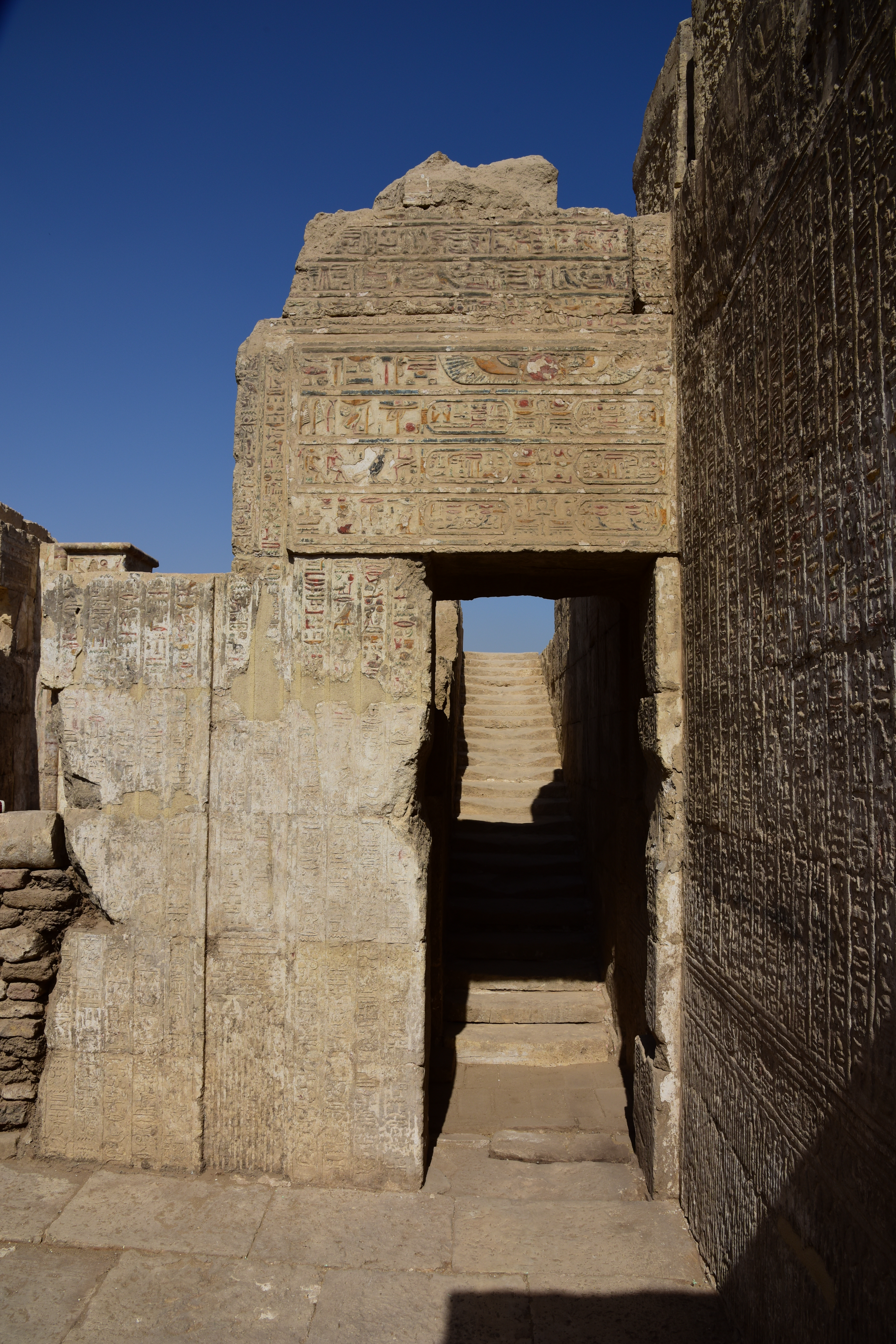
Northern wall of room E1 and the staircase G

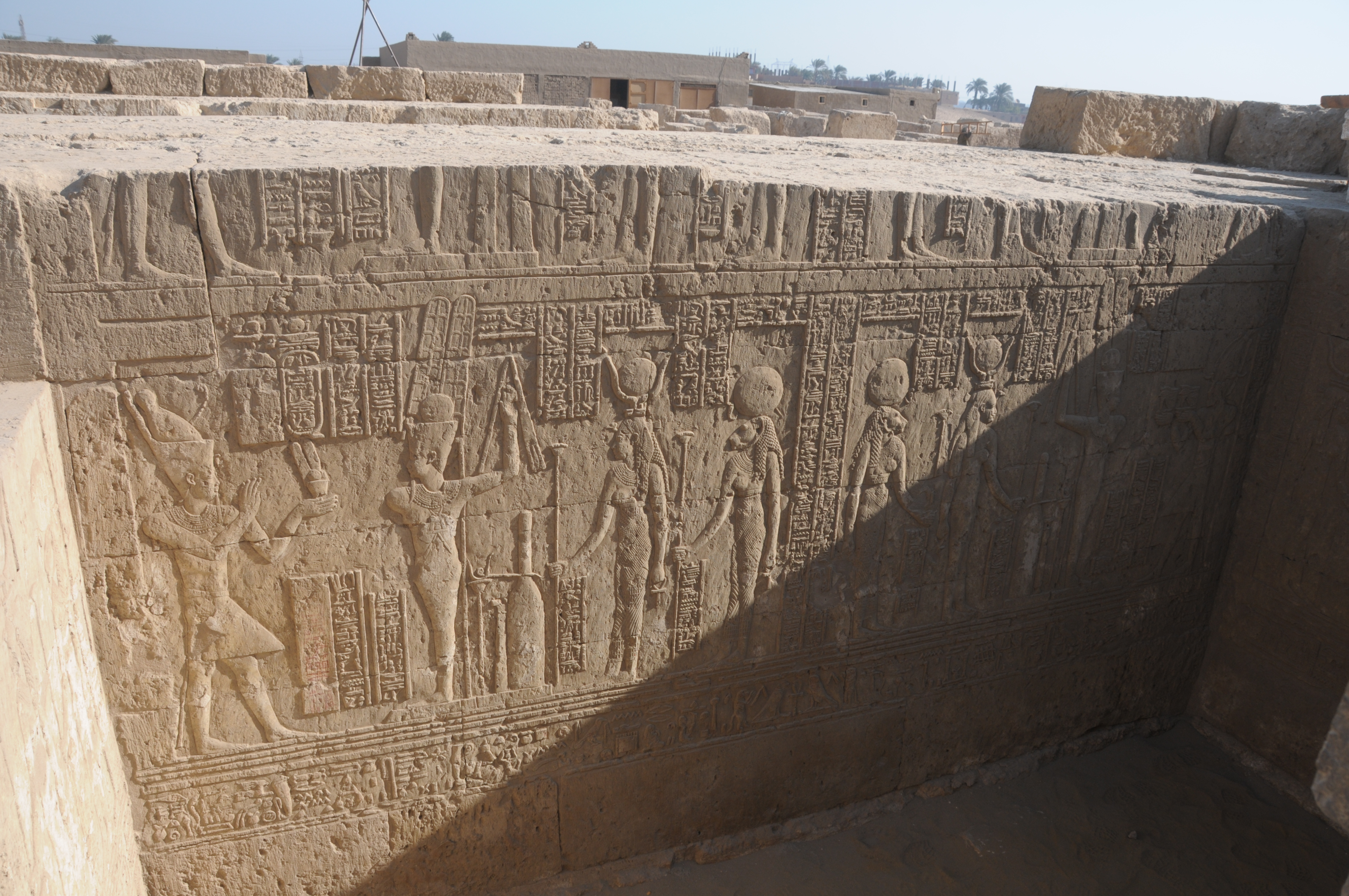
Relief in the fabric chamber (E4)
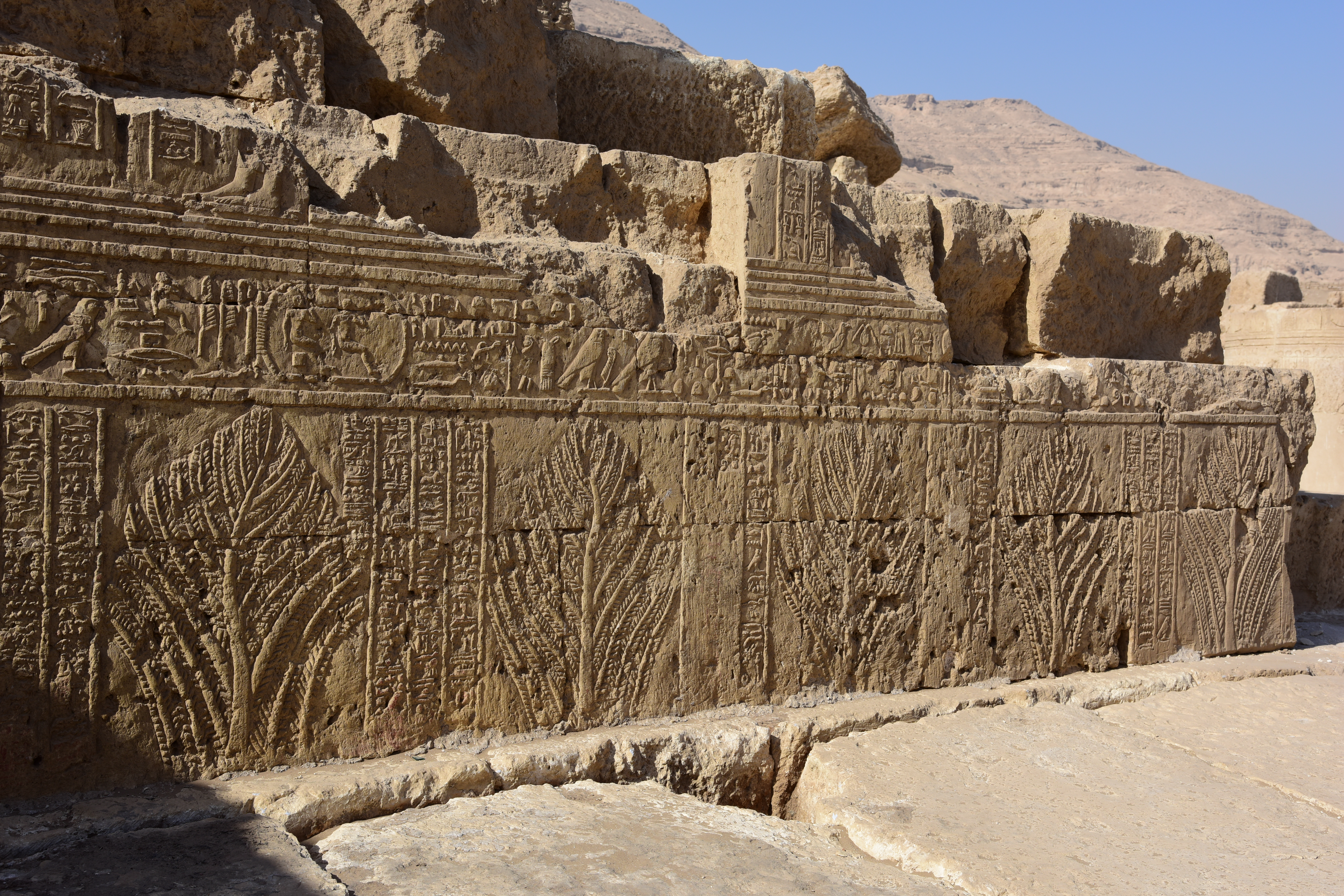
Incense and myrrh trees (room F6)

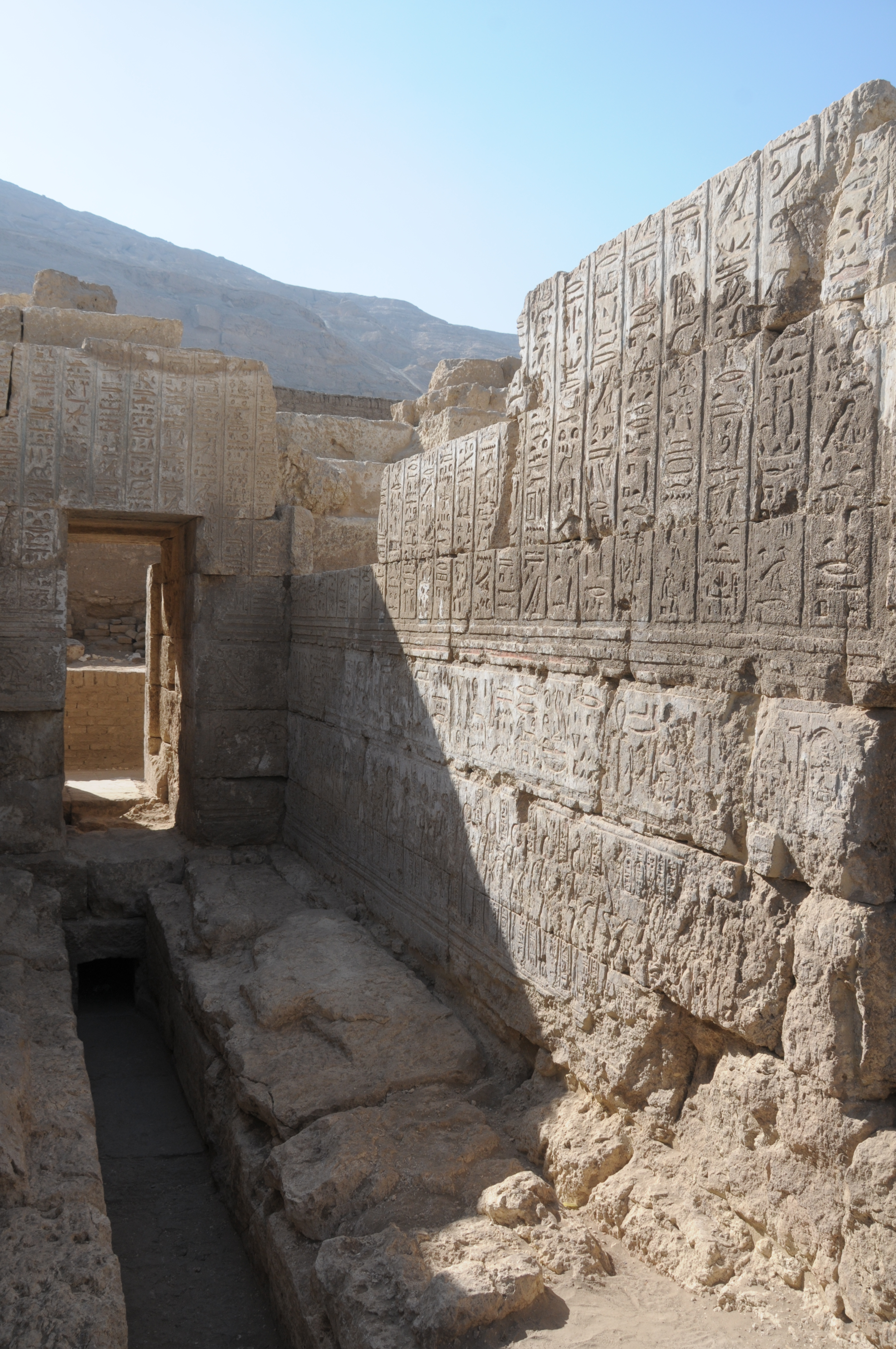
Room J2

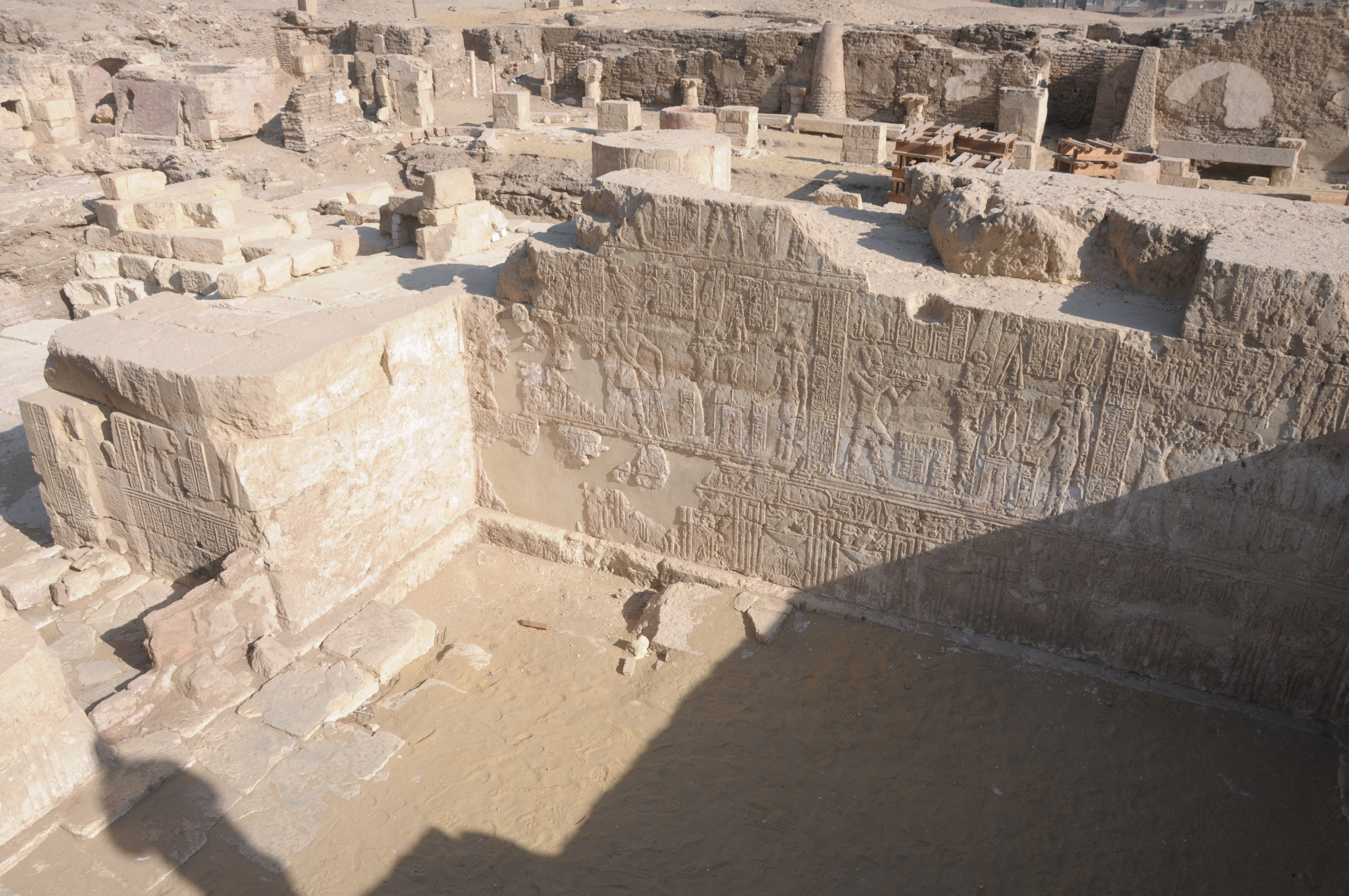
Room K1

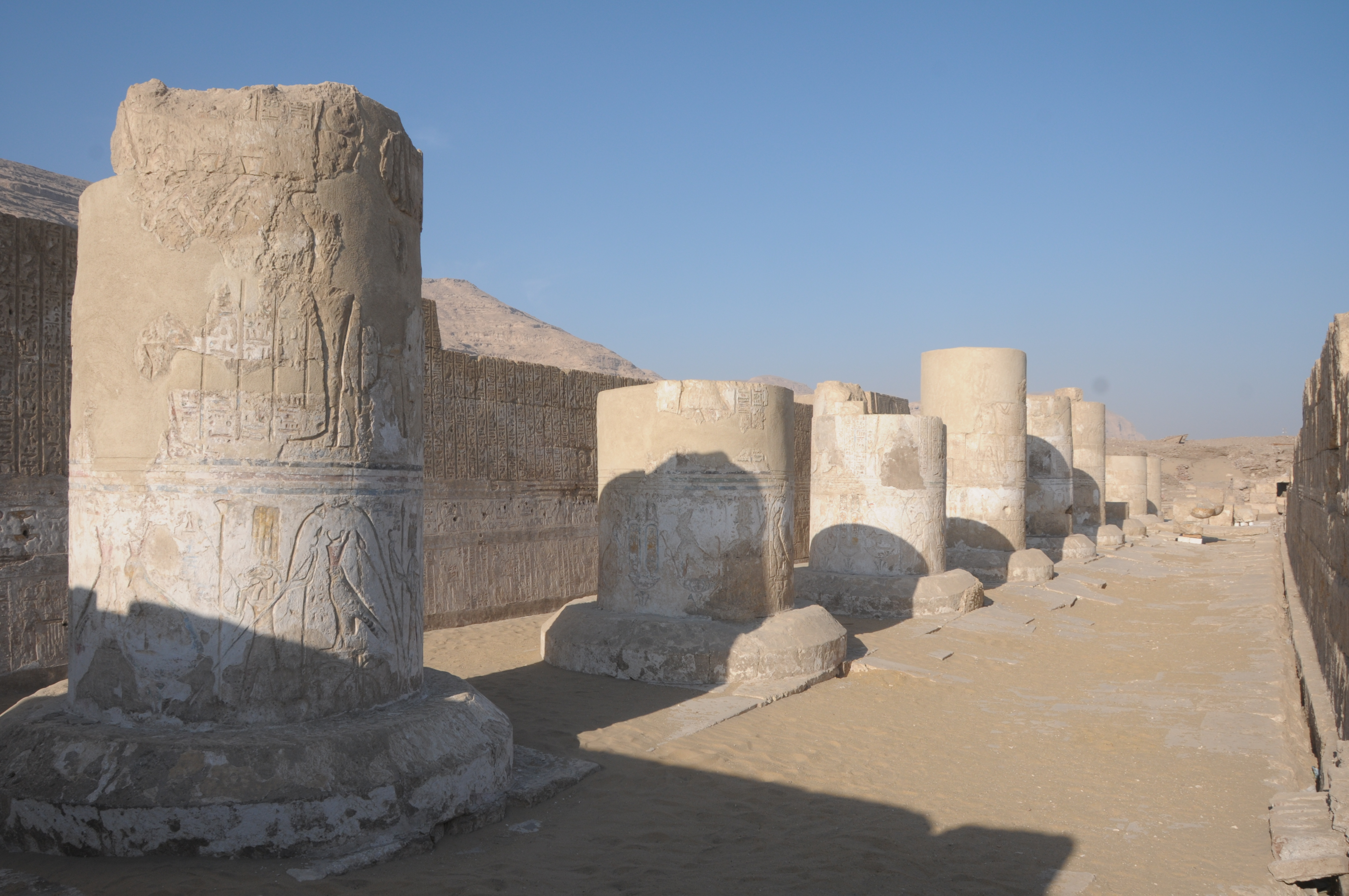
Pillars in room L1

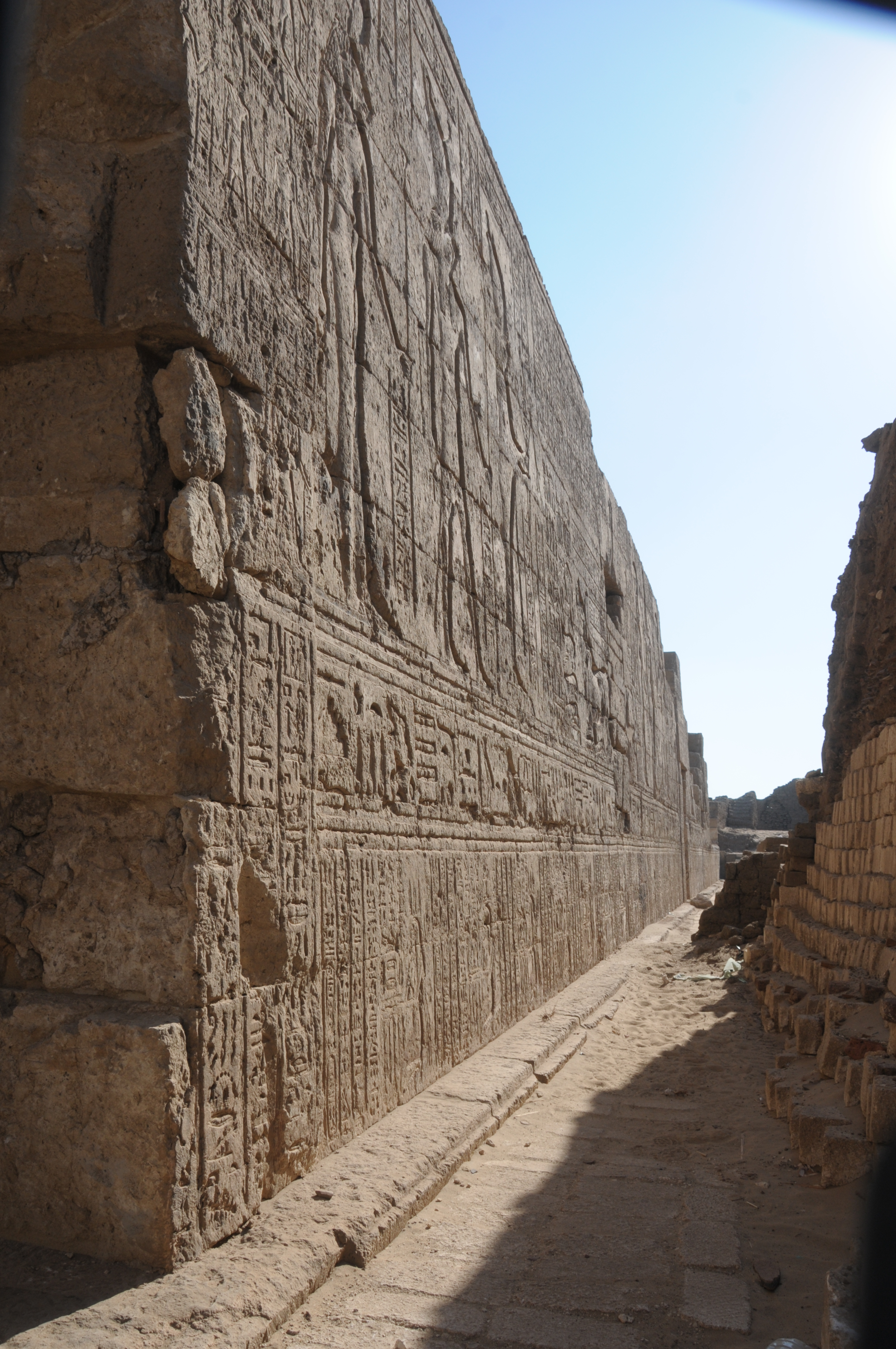
M3

== Deities ==
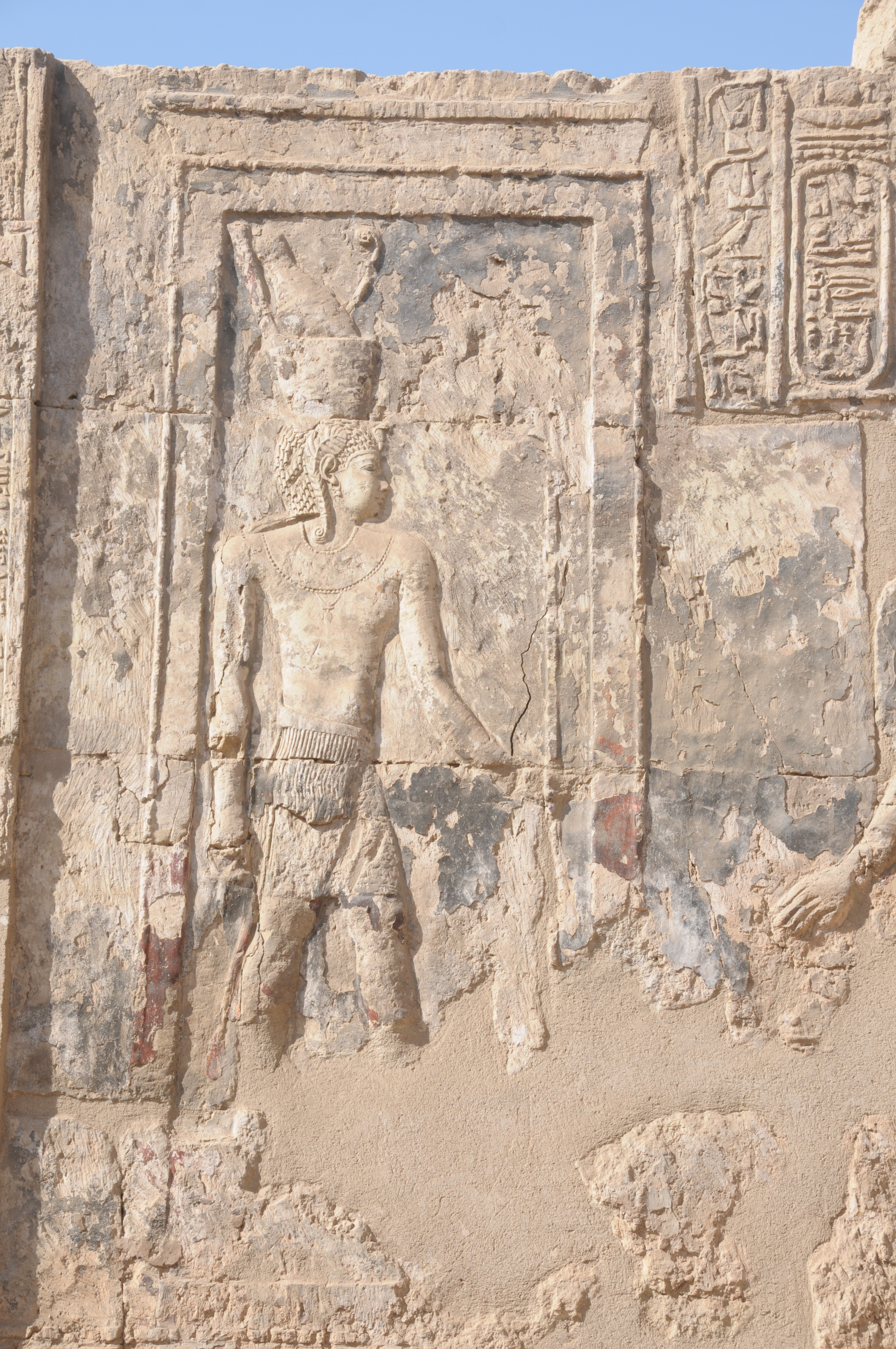
Relief of the child god Kolanthes (room C)

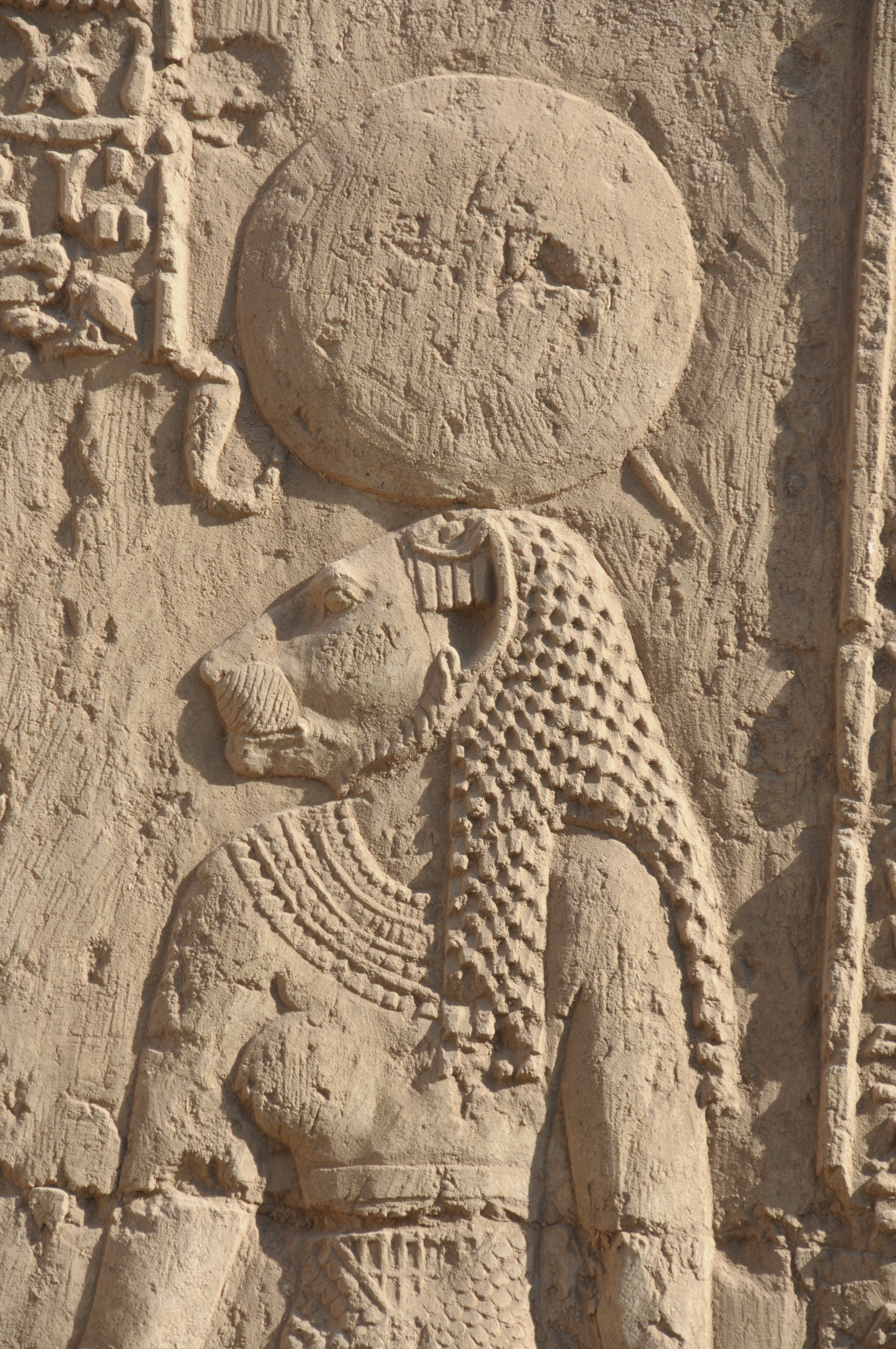
Relief of the goddess Repyt (room E4)

The temple is dedicated to the triad of Min-Re, his wife Repyt and their son Kolanthes. Min-Re, also worshipped in Achmim, represented fertility and is therefore portrayed ithyphallic with a double-feathered crown and an arm stretched upwards as if about to strike. Repyt, who takes the form of a lion, is honoured in this temple as the daughter of Ra and a sun goddess in her own right, like other lion goddesses, for example Sekhmet. She wears a sun disc and a uraeus cobra on her head, taking on a protective role. Kolanthes is depicted typically as a child in Ancient Egypt, sitting with his finger to his mouth and his hair in the traditional prepubescent style (sidelock of youth).

== Hieroglyphic texts and other decoration ==
The roughly 1,300 hieroglyphic inscriptions so far found in the temple, made up of texts spread over 34 rooms, not only contain important written information but are also beautifully decorated. To achieve this two different relief techniques were used: raised carving, used mainly in the inner, covered rooms, and sunken reliefs in the outer areas.

Paint was applied on the incised images and hieroglyphs. Six basic colours were used: white (from plant extracts), black (from rust), red, yellow, green and blue (all from mineral extracts). The colours were not applied in an attempt to emulate the true-life colours of the objects depicted in the images and hieroglyphs, but were used according to the religious symbolism of each colour. For example, green had associations with fertility, regeneration and rebirth and was as such used for the skin of mummies and the god Osiris, since they are re-born in the underworld.

A large portion of the scenes portray the offerings and rituals performed by the King for the gods. He presents tribute of food, jewellery and perfume as well as more abstract gifts like permanence and life. In the lowest register of the decorations the figures are standing, in the second register they are enthroned. In the texts that accompany them the scenes are described more closely and the names, titles and characteristics of the gods and the kings are given. Generally, the King is shown asking the gods to accept his gifts, in order that he might receive a gift in return. The Nile flood together with agricultural and regional deities are included, carved at the bottom of the wall, also bringing gifts to the temple. In addition to these, other figures are shown bringing jars of different ingredients, for example as incense to burn.

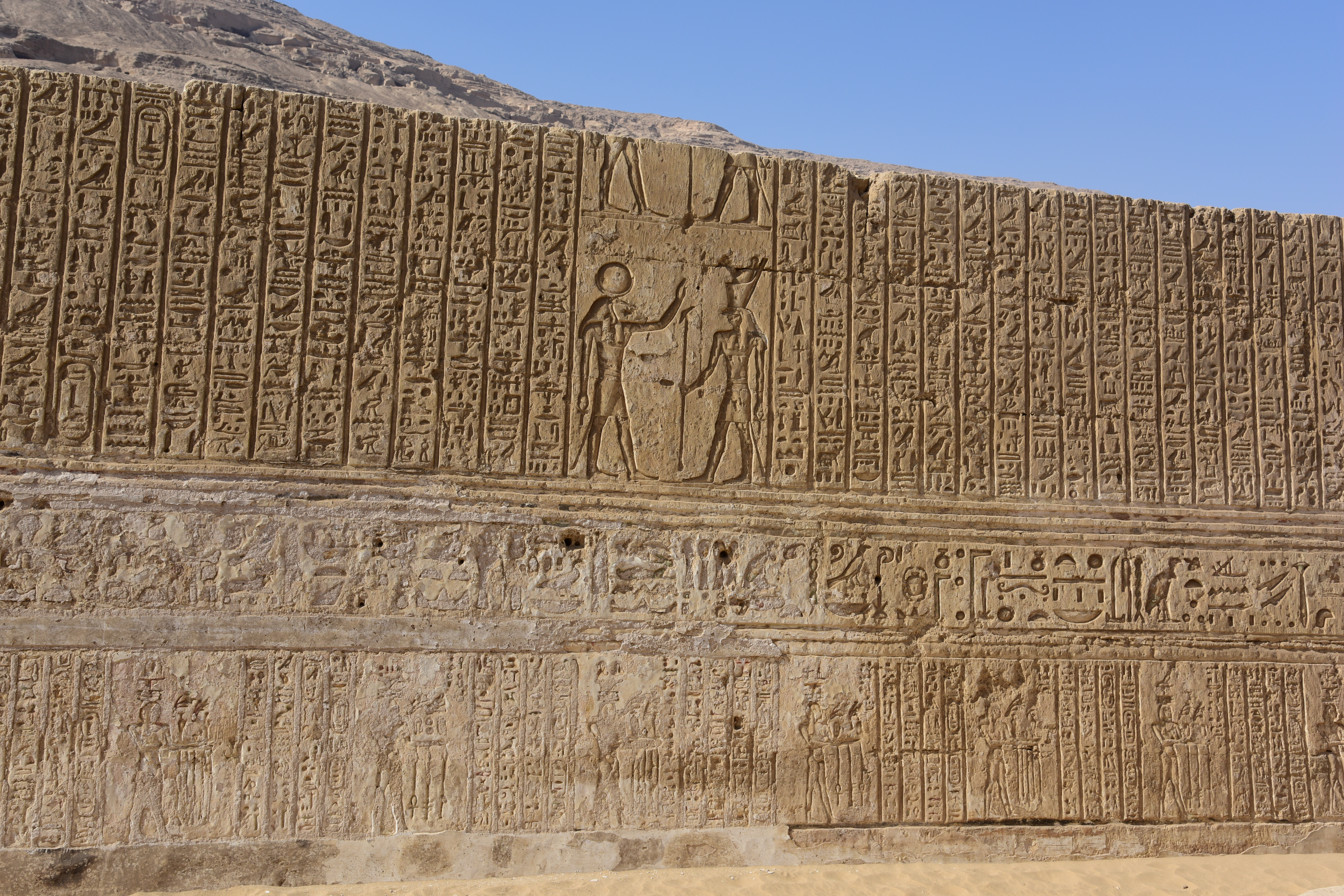
Outer wall of L1

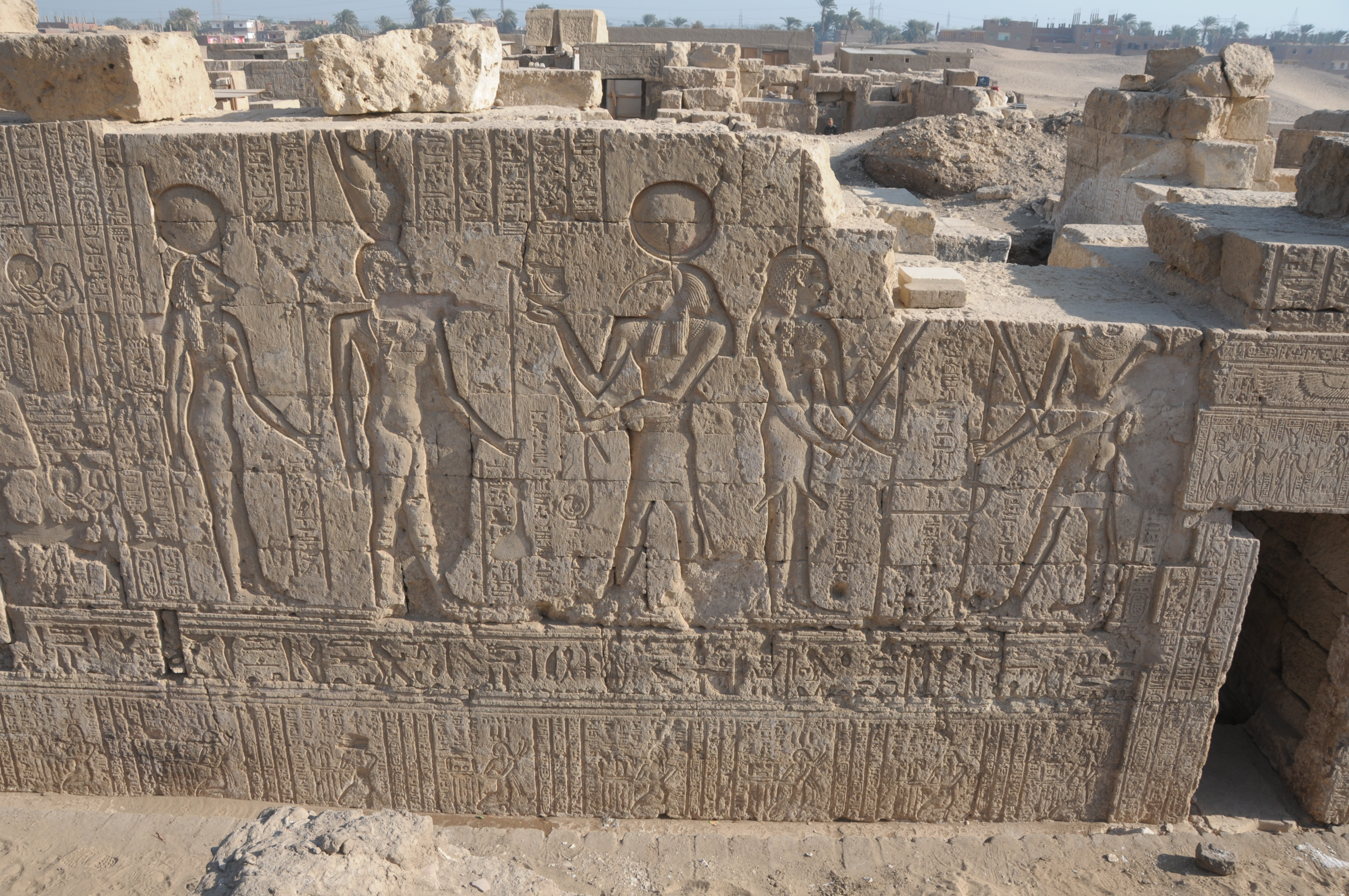
1st and 2nd register (M3)

== Publications ==
- Christian Leitz, Daniela Mendel, Yahya El-Masry: Athribis II. Die Inschriften des Tempels Ptolemaios XII.: Die Opfersäle, der Umgang und die Sanktuarräume. 3 Volumes, Institut français d'archéologie orientale du Caire, Cairo 2010.
- Rafed El-Sayed, Yahya El-Masry (Hrsg.): Athribis I. General site survey 2003–2007, archaeological & conservation studies; the gate of Ptolemy IX, architecture and inscriptions. 2 Volumes, Institut français d'archéologie orientale du Caire, Cairo 2012.
- Christian Leitz: Geographisch-osirianische Prozessionen aus Philae, Dendara und Athribis, Soubassementstudien II (= Studien zur spätägyptischen Religion. Volume 8). Harrassowitz, Wiesbaden 2012.
- Christian Leitz, Daniela Mendel, Mohamed el-Bialy: Die Außenwände und westlichen Seitenkapellen des Tempels von Athribis. 2 Volumes, Ministry of Antiquities Press, Cairo 2014.
- Christian Leitz, Daniela Mendel: Athribis III. Die östlichen Zugangsräume und Seitenkapellen sowie die Treppe zum Dach und die rückwärtigen Räume des Tempels Ptolemaios XII. 2 Volumes, Institut français d'archéologie orientale du Caire, Cairo 2017.
- Christian Leitz, Daniele Mendel: Athribis IV. Der Umgang L 1 bis L 3. 2 Volumes, Institut français d'archéologie orientale du Caire, Cairo 2017.
- Christian Leitz, Marcus Müller, Carolina Teotino: Der Tempel Ptolemaios' XII. in Athribis: das größte Mammisi Ägyptens. In: Sokar 38, 2019, 84–96.

== Literature ==
- Marcus Müller, Carolina Teotino: Tempel der Repit in Athribis. In: Archäologie in Deutschland. 2016: 6, p. 14–19 (ISSN 0176-8522).
- Christian Leitz, Rafed El-Sayed: Athribis. Der Tempel der Löwengöttin. Portrait einer Grabung in Oberägypten. Pagina, Tübingen 2005.
- Christian Leitz: Aromatische Substanzen. In: A. Rickert, B. Ventker: Altägyptische Enzyklopädien. Die Soubassements in den Tempeln der griechisch-römischen Zeit (= Studien zur spätägyptischen Religion. Volume 7). Harrassowitz, Wiesbaden 2014, p. 483–515.
- Daniela Mendel: Die Soubassements der Säulen im Tempel von Athribis: Die Götter von Chemmis. In: A. Rickert, B. Ventker (Hrsg.): Altägyptische Enzyklopädien. Die Soubassements in den Tempeln der griechisch-römischen Zeit (= Studien zur spätägyptischen Religion. Volume 7). Wiesbaden 2014, p. 819–840.
