= Mammisi =

Ancient Egyptian small chapel

A mammisi (mamisi) is an ancient Egyptian small chapel attached to a larger temple (usually in front of the pylons), built from the Late Period, and associated with the nativity of a god. The word is derived from Coptic – the last phase of the ancient Egyptian language – meaning "birth place". Its usage is attributed to the French egyptologist Jean-François Champollion (1790–1832).

== Religious references ==
Major temples inhabited by a divine triad could be completed by a peristyle-surrounded mammisi, in which the goddess of the triad would give birth to the son of the triad itself. The son, whose divine birth was celebrated annually, was associated with the Pharaoh (even in the hierogamy scenes on the walls).

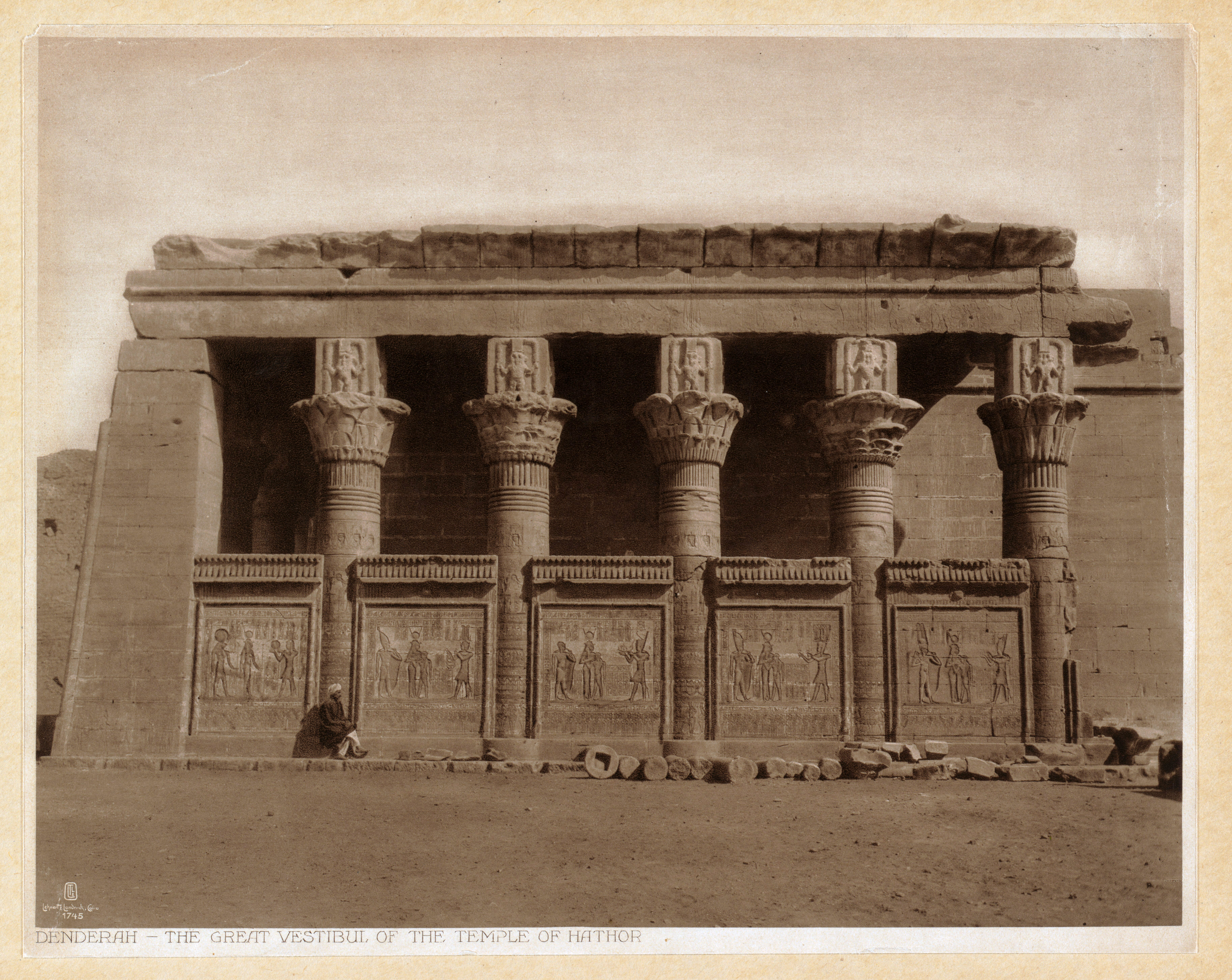
The Roman mammisi attached to the Dendera Temple complex, in an ancient photogravure

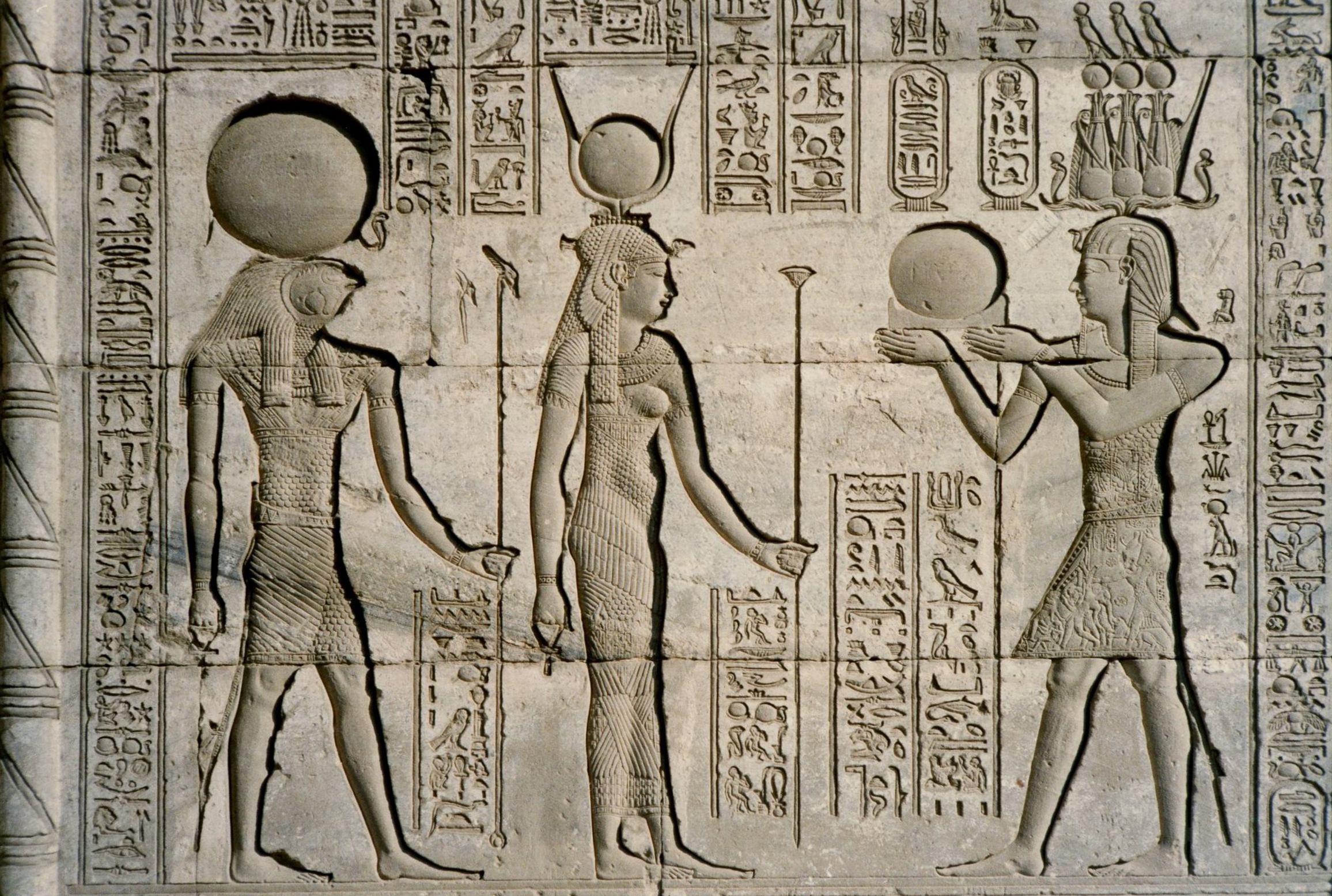
Relief with Ra, Hathor and Emperor Trajan (AD 98–117) in the Roman mammisi of Dendera

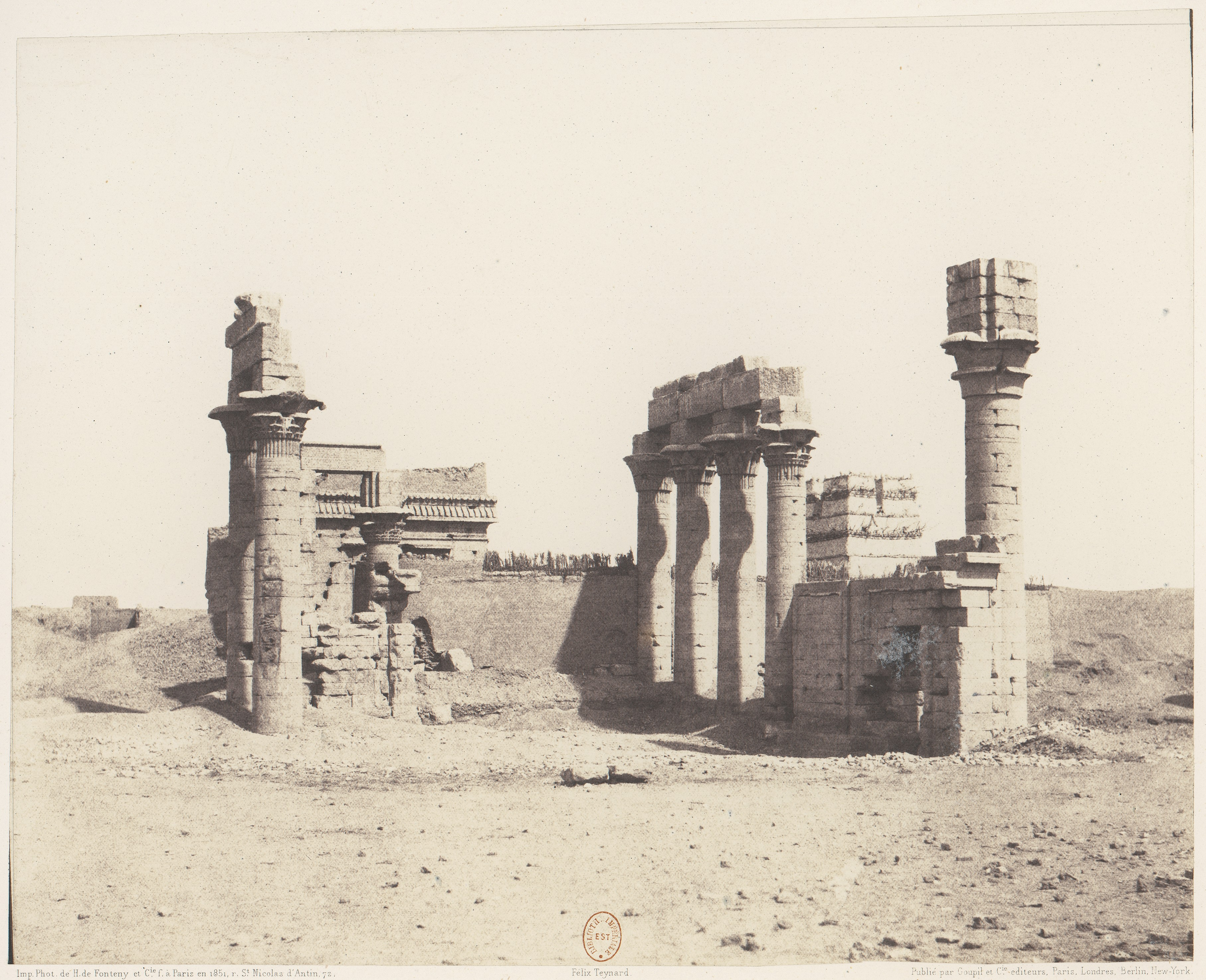
Ruins of the Temple of Montu at Armant, with a glimpse of the mammisi Cleopatra VII dedicated to her son

Taweret, Raet-Tawy and the Seven Hathors who presided over childbirth were particularly revered here, but it is equally common to find references to Bes, Khnum and Osiris himself as fertility deities. Mammisis thus formed an architectural translation of the myth of divine birth and its eternal repetition. From the end of the Late Period these buildings confirm the restoration of royal power that each dynasty will strive to assert in the very heart of the great sanctuaries of the country, including the Roman emperors.

== Notable Mammisi ==
Temple complex	Dedication
Dendera (1st)	Birth of Harsiese, "Horus son of Isis"
Dendera (2nd)	Birth of Ihy, son of Horus and Hathor
Philae	Birth of Harpocrates, "Horus the Child"
Kom Ombo	Birth of Panebtawy, "Horus Lord of the Two Lands, the Child"
Edfu	Birth of Harsomtus, "Horus Unifier of the Two Lands"
Esna	Birth of Heka, son of Khnum and Neith
Athribis	Birth of Kolanthes, son of Min and Repyt
Armant (1st)	Birth of Harpre, "Horus the sun"
Armant (2nd)	Birth of Caesarion, son of Cleopatra VII and Julius Caesar
Kellis (Dakhla Oasis)	Tutu
El Kab	Nekhbet as Hathor

== Dendera ==
The most important surviving examples in Dendera, Edfu, Kom Ombo, Philae, El Kab, Athribis, Armant, the Dakhla Oasis etc. are from the Ptolemaic and Roman periods in Egypt; but the first one, in Dendera, dates back to the 30th dynasty Pharaoh Nectanebo I (379/378–361/360 BC), one of the last native rulers of Egypt. Equipped with a hypostyle by Pharaoh Ptolemy VI Philometor (181–145 BC) and with a peristyle by Ptolemy X Alexander I (110–88 BC), it was dedicated to Harsiese ("Horus son of Isis"). This 30th dynasty project was then repeated, by the Græco-Roman rulers, for some of the major shrines in the country.

The famous Roman mammisi – the less ancient one associated with the Dendera Temple complex – was built by Augustus immediately after his conquest of Egypt (31 BC). The murals show Augustus' far successor Trajan at the sacrificial ceremony for Hathor and are among the most beautiful in Egypt. The mammisi was dedicated to Hathor and her child Ihy. On the abacus above the pillar capitals are representations of Bes as the patron god of birth.

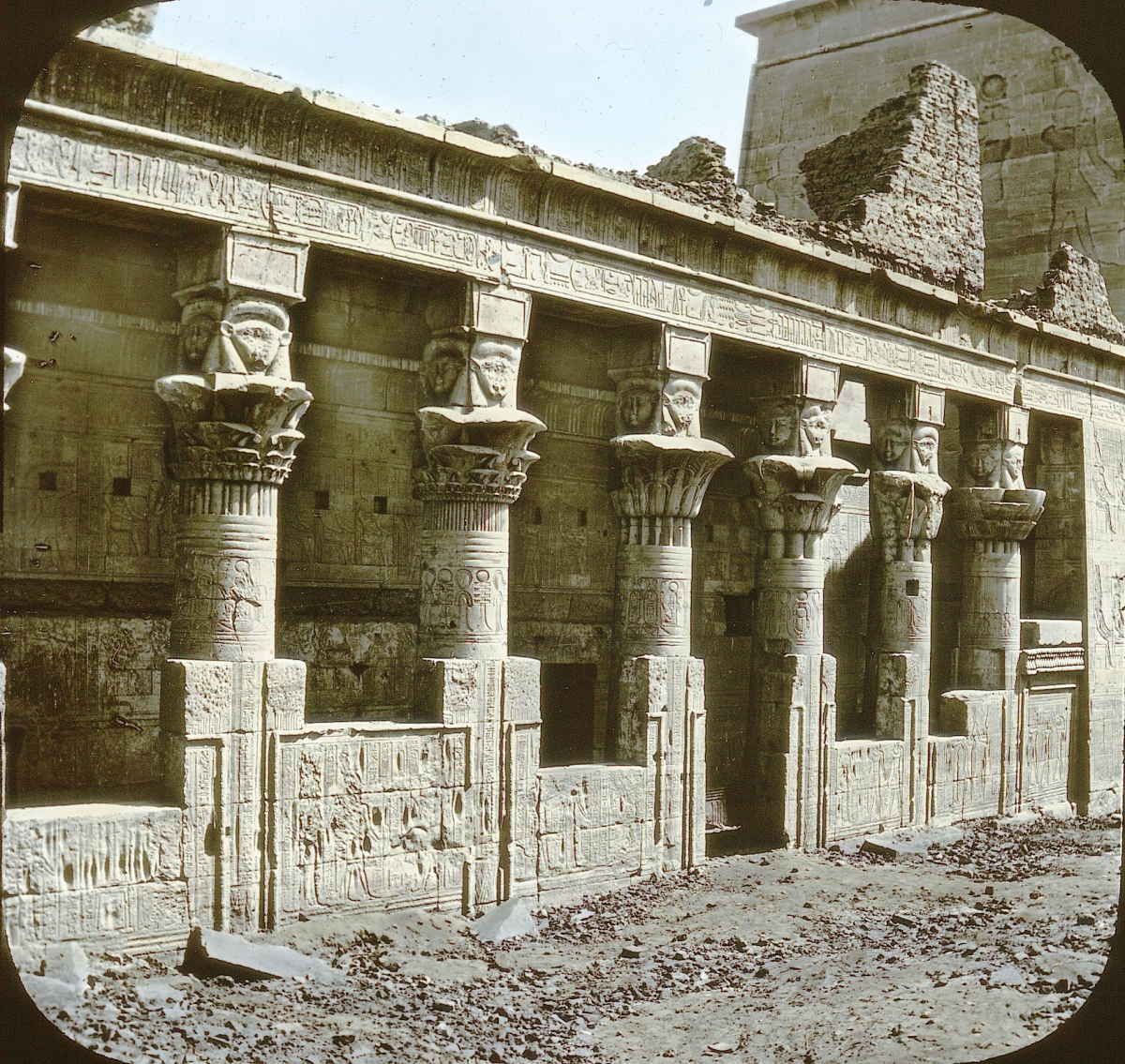
Ruins of the Philae mammisi, built by various Ptolemaic Pharaohs, in a vintage photograph.

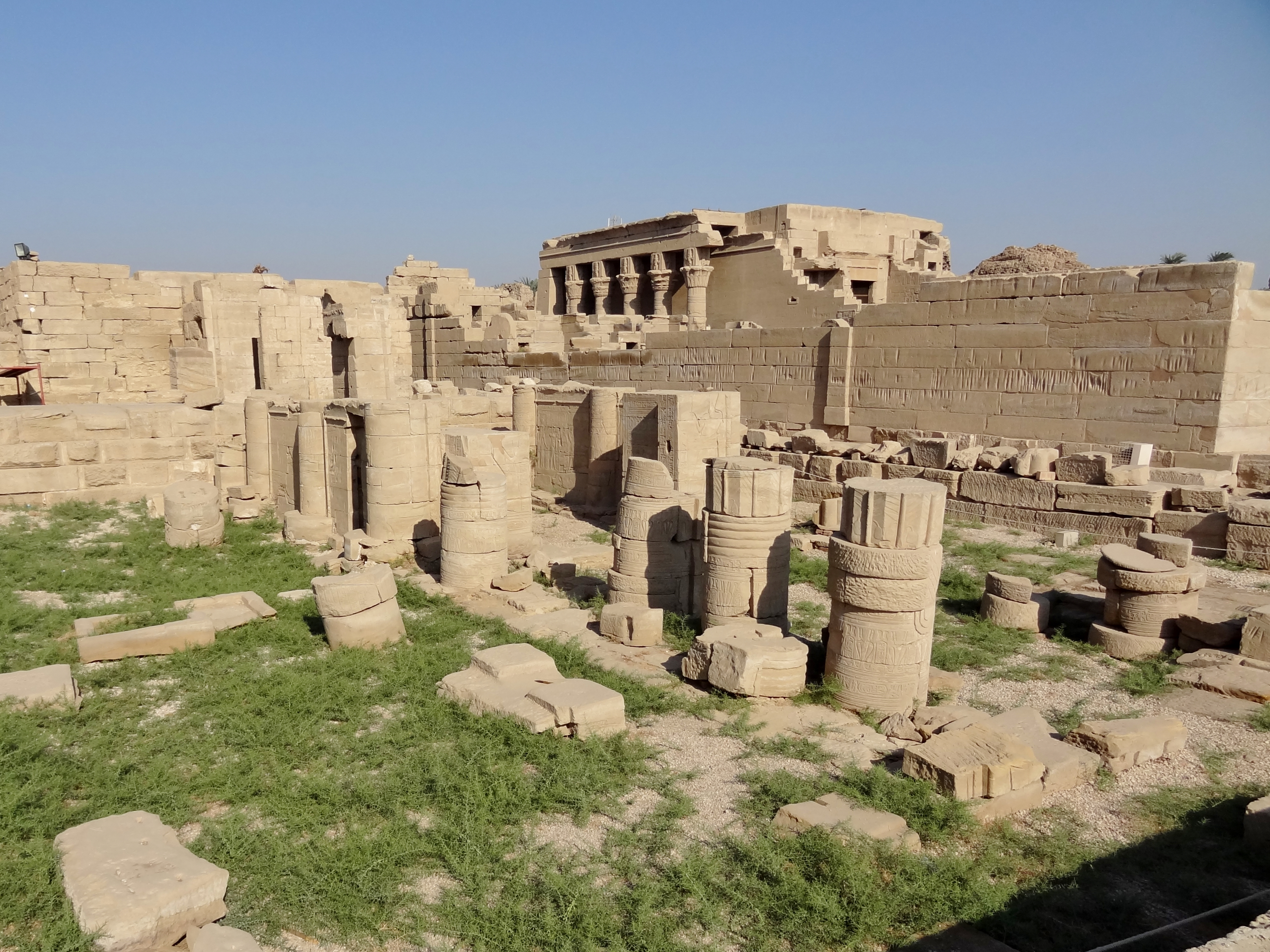
Ruins of the Dendera mammisi built by Pharaoh Nectanebo I (379/378–361/360 BC), one of the last native pharaohs.

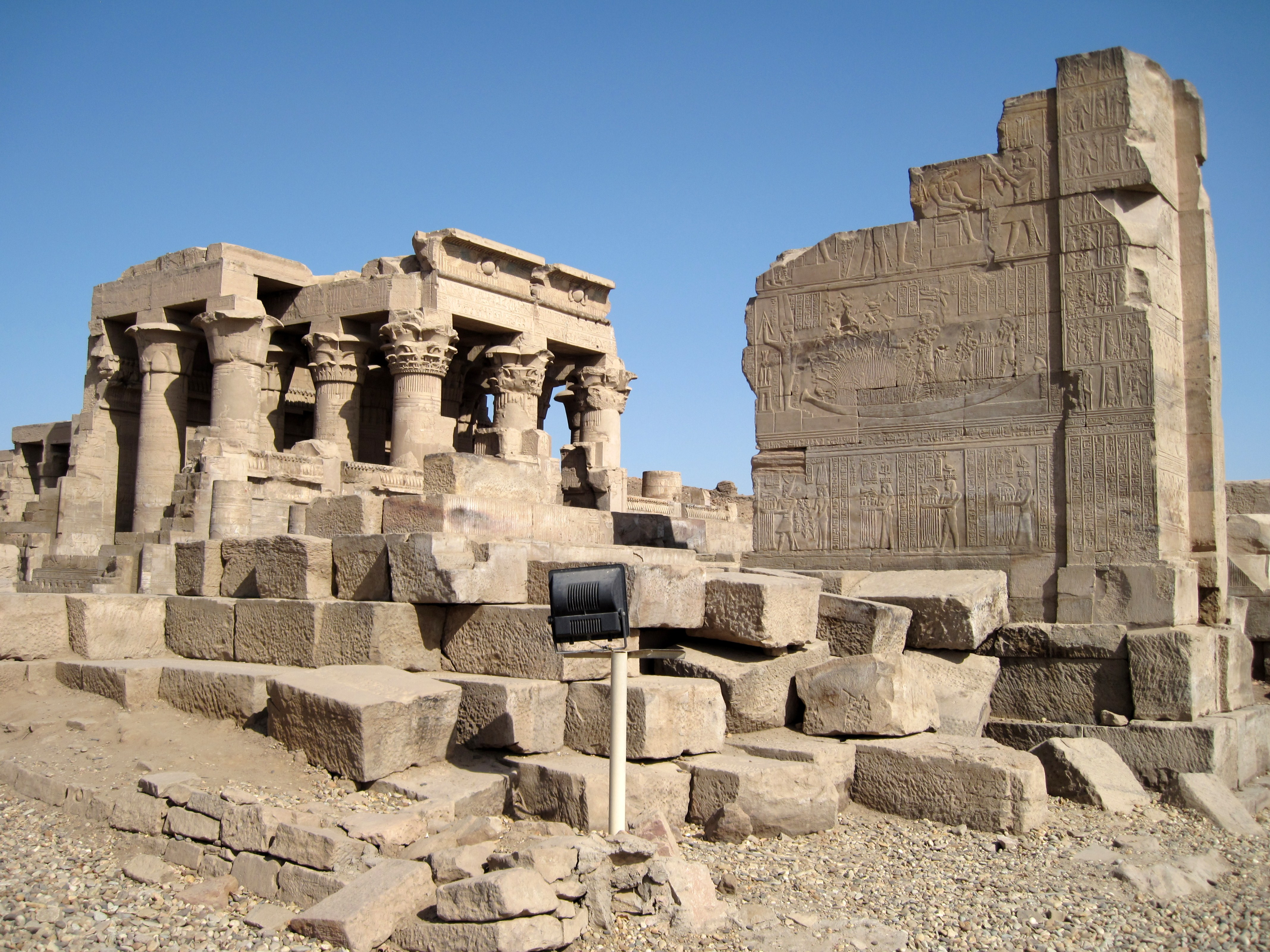
Ruins of the Kom Ombo mammisi built by Pharaoh Ptolemy VIII Physcon (2nd century BC).

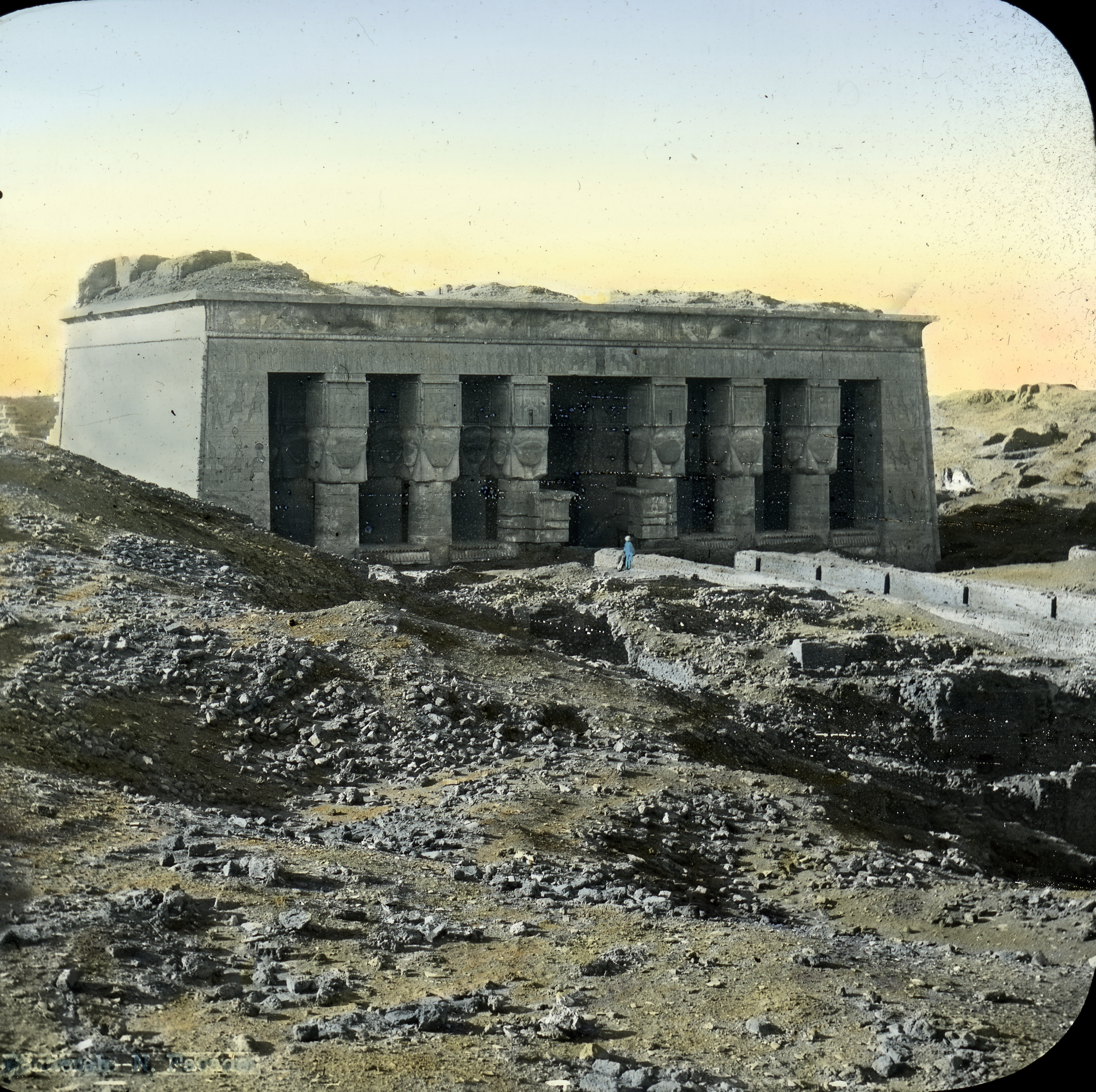
Ruins of the Dendera mammisi built by various Roman Emperors in a vintage photograph

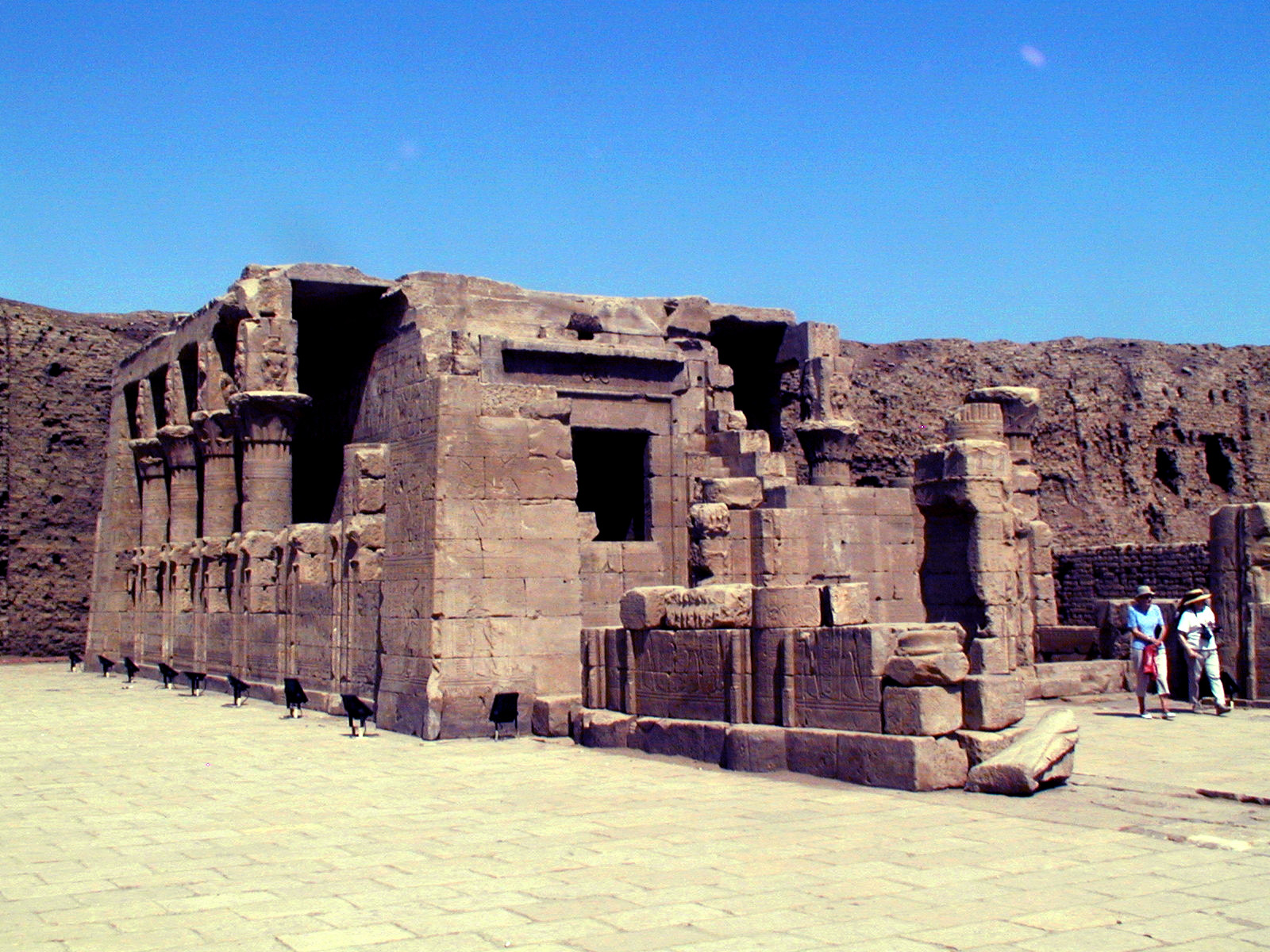
Ruins of the Edfu mammisi built by various Ptolemaic and Roman rulers.
