= Ihy =

God in ancient Egyptian mythology

Name in hieroglyphs
i H i i
- Symbol: Sistrum

Genealogy
- Parents: Horus or Ra (father); Varied, Hathor, Isis, Sekhmet, or Neith (mother)

Ihy is a young god in Egypt usually portrayed with the sistrum. This is in allusion to his mother Hathor who was associated with the instrument. Ihy's symbols are the sistrum and a necklace. The name Ihy depicts the joy of playing the hand instrument by Hathor, or "calf." The Egyptians themselves associated the name with the noisemaker.

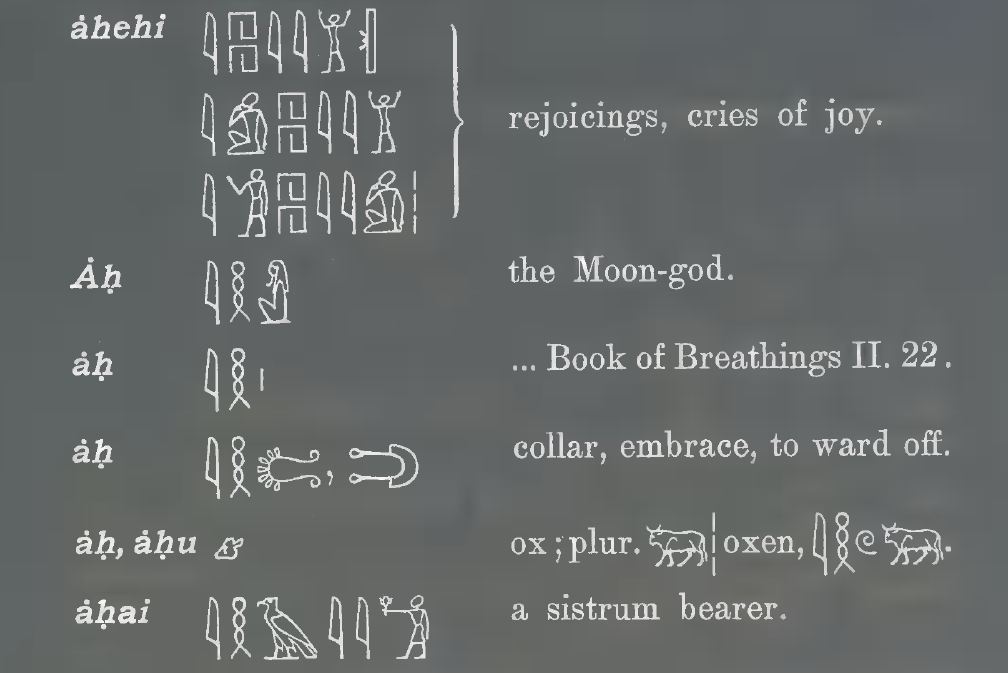

Other goddesses including Isis, Sekhmet, and Neith are also sometimes seen as his mothers in different legends. War deity Horus is Ihy's father, but sometimes solar deity Ra is also seen as his father. Ihy was depicted as a naked child, with curly hair, wearing a necklace and holding a sistrum or as a nude child with his finger in his mouth. He was worshipped along with Horus and Hathor as a trio at Dendera, Ihy's main cult site, constructed early in the 4th dynasty.

Emperor Augustus prepared a second "birthing house" in the temple of Ihy's mother, with pictures of Ihy's birth and celebrations painted on the wall. Ihy is shown as the god of bread, beer, coffins, and the Book of the Dead. There were mystery plays in 13 acts on fertility in these temples.

== See also ==
- Mammisi
