= Kolanthes =

Ancient Egyptian child deity

Name in hieroglyphs
q F20 U28 A Z1 A17(other spelings)
- Major cult center: Akhmim; Athribis

Genealogy
- Parents: Min (father); Repyt (mother)

Kolanthes or Kolanthes the Child (Koine Greek: Κολάνθης, Ancient Egyptian: 𓈎𓄓𓍑𓄿𓏤𓀔 ) is a child deity from the late period of ancient Egyptian religion. He has been documented since the second century BC in the circle of the deities of Akhmim (Koine Panopolis) in the ninth Upper Egyptian Nome (Egypt).

== Divine Family ==
Kolanthes was a son within the patron trinity of Akhmim. In the Temple of Athribis, his mother was Repyt (Greek Triphis). Aperetiset also was identified as his mother. The god Min acted as his father.

Kolanthes was identified with Horus, the divine child and the Pharaoh, and he was called "the child of Osiris and Isis".

== Cultic sites and written evidence ==
The cult sites of Kolanthes are located north and south of Akhmim. In the quarries of Gabal El Haridi and Ptolemais Hermiou (Arabic: al-Mansha), Demotic (Egyptian) rock inscriptions mentioning Kolanthes have been found. Other sources include Greek inscriptions, a stele inscribed with hieroglyphs from the time of the Roman Emperor Hadrian, and the recently discovered extensive inscriptions from the temple of Athribis.

== Name ==
The hieroglyphic and demotic spellings of the name “Kolanthes” are inconsistent. It may be presumed that this god is not of Egyptian origin.

In the Greek inscriptions, the name is written Κολάνθης, Κολάνθας, or Κολάνθος. The demotic spelling may be translated as QrnDA, according to the Manuel de Codage.

The inscriptions of the Temple of Athribis have different hieroglyphic spellings in the various scenes.

=== Full spellings ===
Szene C 2, 31 ^{2b}:

q F20 U28 A Z1 A17

Szenen C 1, 70^{2}; C 1, 74^{3}; C 3, 15^{2}; C 3, 17^{2}:

q F20 U28 A17

Szenen C 3, 16^{2}; C 5, 57^{2}; C 5, 67^{2}:

q F20 D10 A17

=== Abbreviated Spellings ===
Szenen C 1, 41^{1}; C 1, 51^{1}; C 5, 5^{2}

A17

=== Abbreviated versions of "Kolanthes the Child" ===
 < A17 A17 p >

== Literature ==
- Hans Bonnet: Reallexikon der ägyptischen Religionsgeschichte. de Gruyter, Berlin 1952, 3. unveränderte Auflage, Reprint, De Gruyter, Berlin 2010, ISBN 978-3-11-082790-3, S. 379.
- Jan Quaegebeur: Kolanthes. In: Wolfgang Helck (Hrsg.): Lexikon der Ägyptologie (LÄ). Band III, Harrassowitz, Wiesbaden 1980, ISBN 978-3-447-02100-5, Sp. 671–672.
- Lexikon der ägyptischen Götter und Götterbezeichnungen. Band 8: Register (= Orientalia Lovaniensia analecta. Band 129). Peeters, Leuven 2003, ISBN 978-90-429-1376-9, S. 684
- Rafed El-Sayed, Yahya El-Masry (Hrsg.): Athribis I. General Site Survey 2003–2007. Archaeological & Conservation Studies. The Gate of Ptolemy IX. Architecture and Inscriptions (= Publications de l'Institut Français d'Archéologie Orientale du Caire. Band 1010). Imprimerie de l'Institut Français d'Archéologie Orientale, Kairo 2012, ISBN 978-2-7247-0529-4
- Christian Leitz, Daniela Mendel, Yahya El-Masry: Athribis II. Der Tempel Ptolemaios' XII.: Die Inschriften und Reliefs der Opfersäle, des Umgangs und der Sanktuarräume 3 Bände (= Publications de l'Institut Français d'Archéologie Orientale du Caire. Band 1016). Imprimerie de l'Institut Français d'Archéologie Orientale, Kairo 2010, ISBN 978-2-7247-0539-3
- Christian Leitz, Daniela Mendel: Athribis III. Die östlichen Zugangsräume und Seitenkapellen sowie die Treppe zum Dach und die rückwärtigen Räume des Tempels Ptolemaios XII. 2 Bände, Institut français d'archéologie orientale du Caire, Kairo 2017.
- Christian Leitz, Daniela Mendel: Athribis IV. Der Umgang L 1 bis L 3. 2 Bände, Institut français d'archéologie orientale du Caire, Kairo 2017.
