= Athribis (Upper Egypt) =

Athribis ⲁⲧⲣⲉⲡⲉ ⲁⲑⲣⲏⲃⲓ أدريبة
- Location in Egypt
- Coordinates: 26°30′41″N 31°39′55″E
- Country: Egypt
- Governorate: Sohag
- Time zone: UTC+2 (EET)
  - Summer (DST): UTC+3 (EEST)

Athribis (Ancient Greek: Ἄθλιβις; Coptic: ⲁⲧⲣⲉⲡⲉ or ⲁⲑⲣⲏⲃⲓ), also known to the ancient Greeks as Triphieion or Tripheion, and to the ancient Egyptians as Hut-Repyt, was an ancient city of Egypt, in the Panopolite nome. The modern villages of Wannina and Nag' Hamad in the Sohag Governorate are situated nearby. It is located some 10 km (6 mi) southwest of the city of Akhmim and about 3 km (2 mi) south of the White Monastery, on the west bank of the Nile.

== Overview ==
O6 X1 O1 D21 Q3 M17 M17 X1 H8 O49
ḥt rpjt
in hieroglyphs

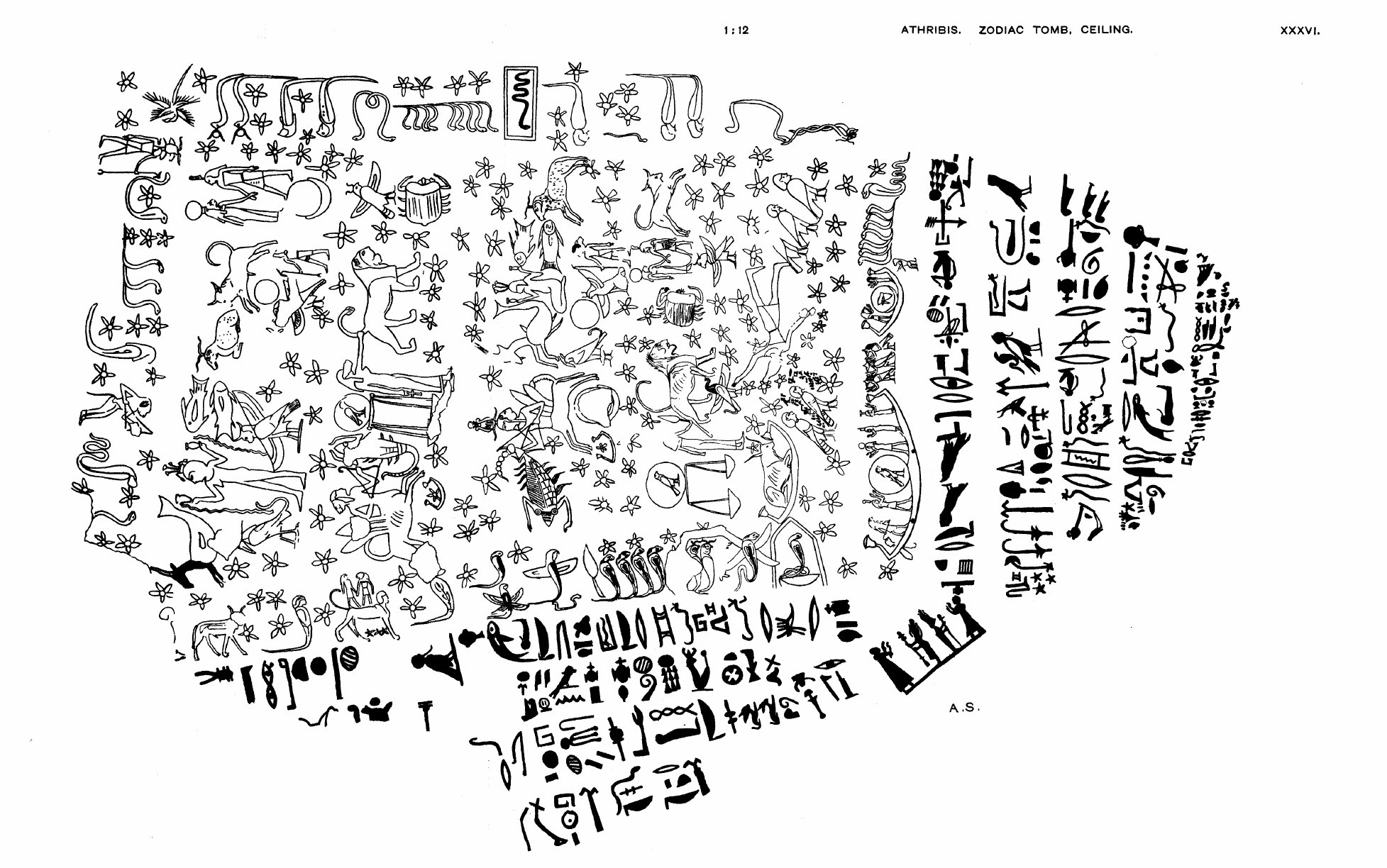

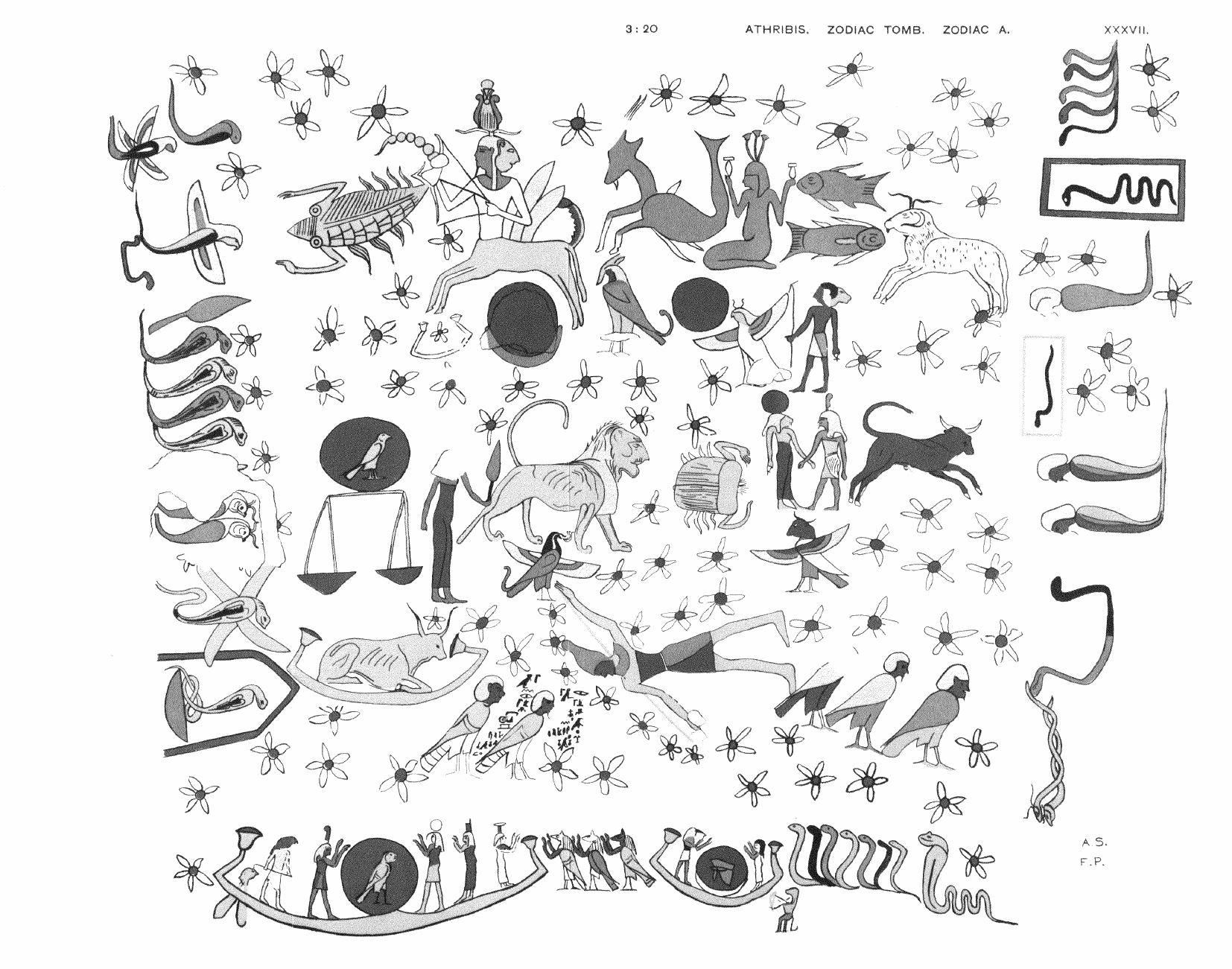

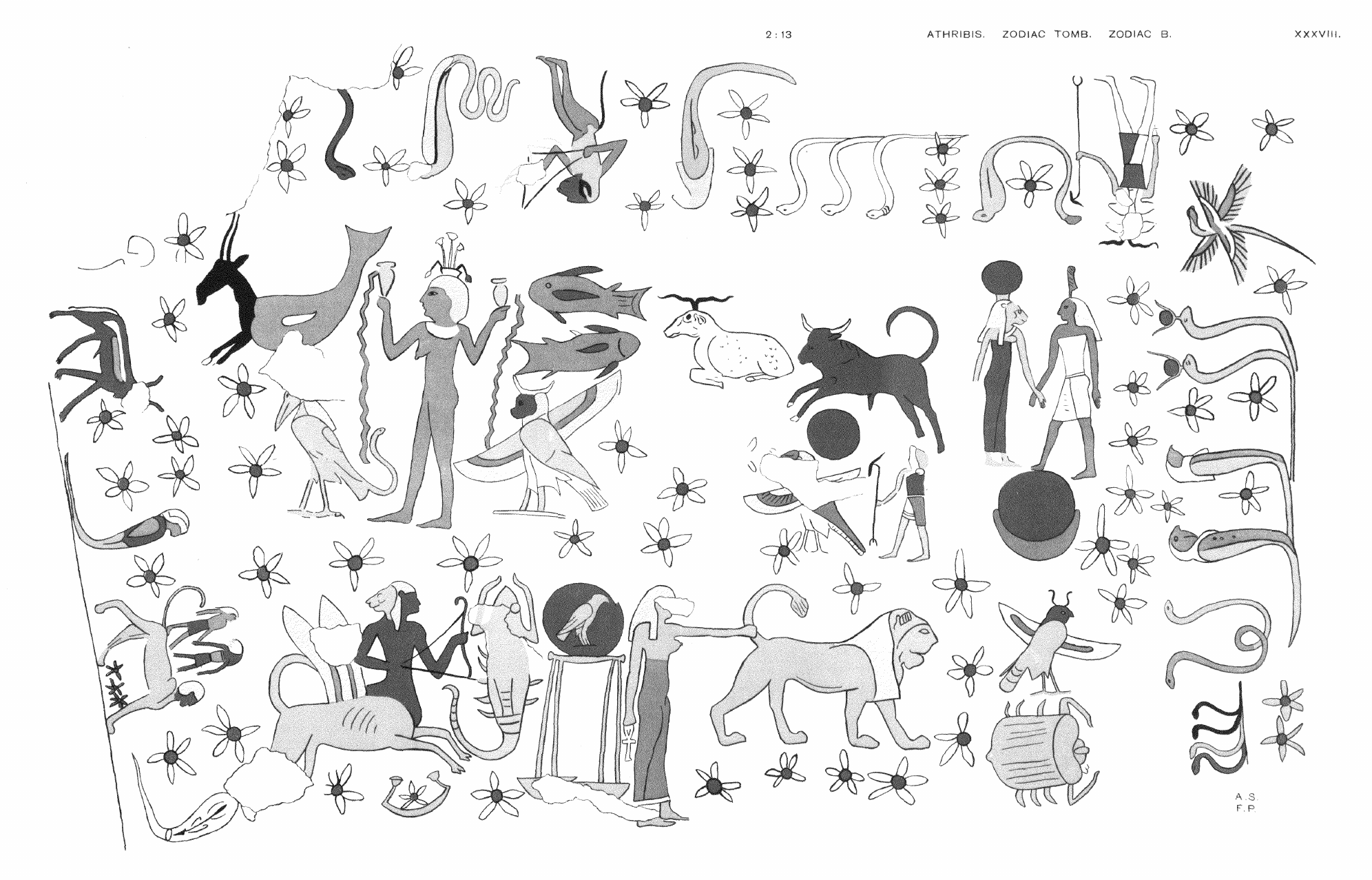

The city is the site of a temple built for the goddess Repyt (Triphis) by Ptolemy XV Caesarion and subsequent Roman Emperors. South of this temple was an earlier temple of Ptolemy IX Soter II. One of the tombs nearby, belonging to the brothers Ibpemeny "the younger" and Pemehyt of the late 2nd century BC, has two zodiacs on its ceiling.

In 2021, archaeologists discovered 13,000 ostraca in Demotic (Egyptian), Hieratic, Coptic, Greek and Arabic with financial transactions.

== See also ==
- Athribis, for the ancient city called Athribis in Lower Egypt.
- Athribis Project
- Dendera zodiac
