= Repyt =

Lioness-headed ancient Egyptian goddess

- Repyt is often depicted as a Goddess with the head of a lioness wearing a sundisk similar, or identical to Menhit.
Name in hieroglyphs
r i p i B1
- Major cult center: Hut-Repyt

Genealogy
- Spouse: Min
- Offspring: Kolanthes

Repyt, or Repit, was an ancient Egyptian goddess. Typically, she was portrayed as one of the lioness goddesses of Egypt. Her husband was Min.

During the late period of ancient Egyptian religion, a child deity, Kolanthes, was identified as her son.

In the Egyptian Greek city of Ptolemais Hermiou, there was a joint shrine to Repyt, Pan, Kolanthes, and the synnaoi theoi.

In ancient times there was a town named Hut-Repyt, where her temple was sited approximately 200 kilometers north of Luxor. Later, the town was renamed as Athribis by the Greeks when it began to grow in importance. The site was excavated by Flinders Petrie in 1900. Now called Wannina, the site lies on the west bank of the Nile approximately 10 kilometers southwest of Sohag. Modern excavations in the area have been conducted since 2012.
