= Teka-her =

Monstrous serpent from Egyptian mythology

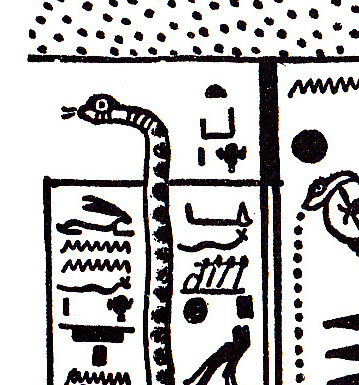
- Head of the Teka-her snake.
Name in hieroglyphs
t kA Q7 Hr Z1
- Venerated in: Ancient Egypt
- Symbol: snake

Teka-her, literally "He with the enlightened face", is a monstrous serpent from Egyptian mythology. His existence is mentioned in the Book of Gates, a composition reserved for New Kingdom pharaohs and inscribed in their tombs. Guardian god and protector, Teka-her is one of the many beings whose task it is to ensure the safety of the Duat, the underworld of the dead. More specifically, he watches over the doorway of the Fourth Hour of the Night, in the company of Tekmy and Amu, jackal-headed mummiform gods. According to Egyptian mythology, during the twelve hours of the night, Ra, the solar god, travels through this inframundum in a boat. At each hourly change, the boat arrives at a gate closely guarded by a cohort of beneficent demons. Their primary role is to destroy the damned souls - Osiris' enemies. With his divine and luminous power, Ra naturally convinces the demons to let him pass.

== Etymology ==
The theonym Teka-her means "He with the enlightened face" or "The illuminated face"; translation of the ancient Egyptian teka "torch, flame, illuminate" and her "face, visage".

== Mythology ==
=== Generalities ===
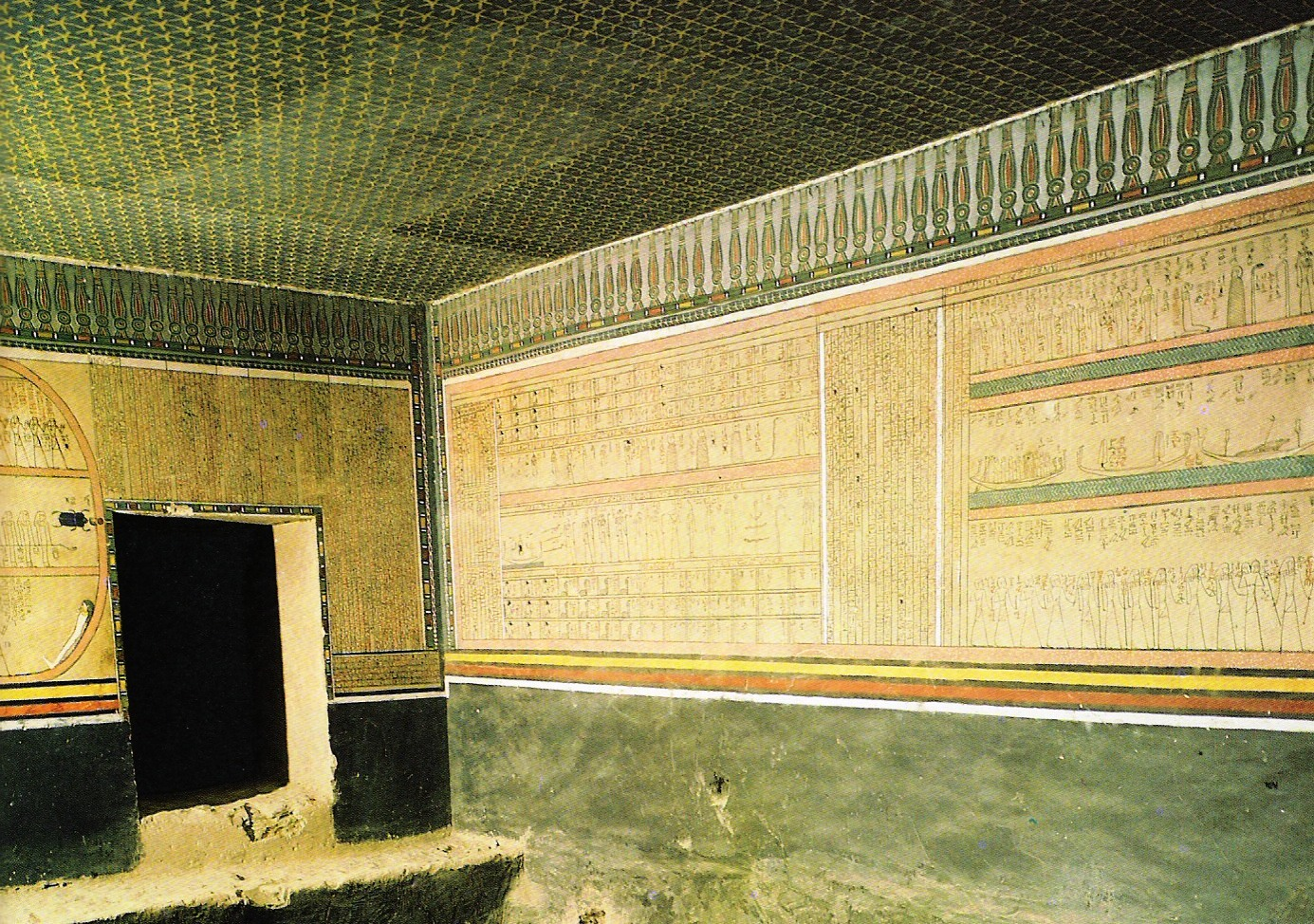
Tomb of Amenhotep II decorated with the Book of Amduat - 18th dynasty.

In ancient Egypt, the sun's course inspired a highly developed literature. The piety of believers was expressed in hundreds of hymns to Ra, the solar god. Educated individuals paid homage to the sun at crucial times of the day (dawn, noon, sunset). (Note: For an overview of Egyptian hymn literature, see: Barucq & Daumas 1980.) Most of these texts can be found inscribed on coffins or on the walls of chapels and funerary tombs. At the same time, in the New Kingdom, an initiatory knowledge was established, reserved for Pharaohs only. This esoteric teaching is displayed on sarcophagi and on the walls of underground tombs in the Valley of the Kings. Several compositions are known, including the Book of Amduat and the Book of Gates. (Note: Assmann 2003, pp. 282-321 : chapter 8, « La mort, mystère ».) (Note: Hornung 2007, pp. 63-67 and 92-107.) In these religious writings, texts and images are interwoven to present the geography of the underworld of the dead. The purpose of the text was to describe the events that take place during the twelve hours of the night when Ra travels from west to east through this land. The Sun's journey takes the form of a gigantic nautical procession on a subterranean Nile. From the banks, the souls of the dead cheer the passing procession. In the early hours of the morning, the Sun reappears before the eyes of the living in the Eastern Horizon, much to their delight. (Note: Hornung 2007, pp. 92–104.)

According to these writings, the underworld is populated by a multitude of dangerous spirits. They are entrusted with the most thankless tasks, such as torturing damned souls or policing the roads like policemen. Armed with knives, their appearance is nightmarish: a human being with the head of a jackal, beetle or tortoise; a gigantic snake, as in the case of Teka-her. The mummy of Osiris, the murdered god, lies at the bottom of this netherworld. (Note: Assmann 2003, pp. 199–200.) But even there, attacks led by the murderer Set can occur. The sacred remains, however, enjoy the protection of a powerful bodyguard under the orders of Horus and Anubis. (Note: Assmann 2003, pp. 114–117, 128.) A multitude of checkpoints (giant portals, haunted hills, recalcitrant nautoniers) bar the way to the Duat. (Note: In the Book of the Dead, chapters 144 to 150 are devoted to this subject. See also: Anubis: Protector of the mummy of Osiris.) The most notable checkpoints are the gates of the twelve hours of the night. There, at every stop, even the sun god Ra must show his credentials and assert his power. Alone before Ra and his entourage, these guardian-genies lower their weapons and open the gates. (Note: Carrier 2009, p. 204.)

=== Role and function ===
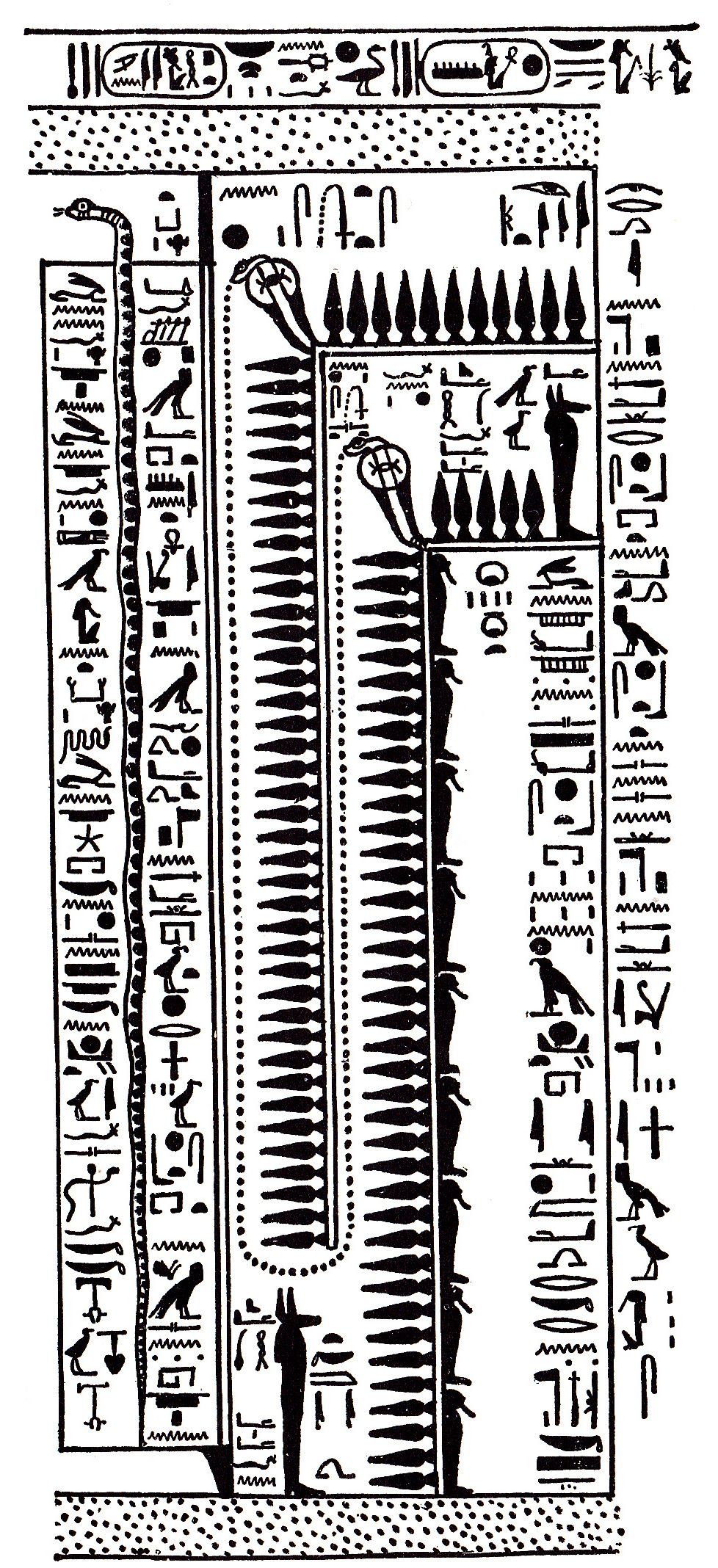
The Teka-her serpent, guardian of the 4th Gate - From the Book of Gates, taken from the sarcophagus of Seti I.

In the Book of Amduat, the Teka-her serpent is mentioned in the 3rd hour of the night (middle register, scene 2). Participating in the divine nocturnal procession, he stands on a boat named "Supplied Boat". He is accompanied by five other deities. Three of them are forms of Horus. At the bow and stern of the boat, two oarsmen keep the craft moving in the desired direction. The first, Nib-her "the one with the flaming face", has a name very similar to that of Teka-her "the one with the enlightened face". The name of the second oarsman is unknown.

The Book of Gates specifically describes the twelve Aryt, the fiery portals that separate the different hours of the night. At the 4th hour, the solar procession arrives at the gate "She who is built". (Note: The Egyptians did not number the hours or the portals. So, depending on the interpretation of Egyptologists, the same scene may be numbered differently in different translations. This 4th Hour may be presented as the 5th, and the 5th as the 6th.) Two female uraeus serpents and two jackal-headed mummiform gods, Amu "The Greedy One" and Tekmy "The Approaching One", guard the passage. The guardian-god Teka-her watches over the doorway in the form of a long snake standing on the tip of its tail. The god Sia, son of Ra, gives him an explicit order: "Open your door for Ra! Open wide your door for the Horizontain, for it illuminates the compact darkness and provides light in the hidden chamber". The hidden chamber refers to the tomb of Osiris behind the door of the 5th Hour, where the judgment of the dead takes place. (Note: Hornung 2007, pp. 99–100.) In addition to his function as supreme judge, Osiris is an important receptacle of vital energy. To regenerate himself, Ra lands on Osiris' mummy, becomes one with him for a brief moment, then continues on his way, fresh and rejuvenated. As soon as Ra enters the 4th Hour, the gate of Teka-her closes behind him, condemning the road to the damned. (Note: Assmann 2003, pp. 282–289.) This is in accordance with a commandment enunciated by Ra himself: (Note: Carrier 2009, pp. 204–205.) "Let your destruction be aimed at my enemies whom you have registered for the place of annihilation! If I have come here, it is to assign my corpses and to cause harm to my enemies". (Note: Carrier 2009, p. 212.)

== See also ==
- Ra

== Bibliography ==
- Assmann, Jan (2003). Mort et au-delà dans l'Égypte ancienne (in French). Monaco: Éditions du Rocher.
- Barucq, André; Daumas, François (1980). Hymnes et prières de l'Égypte ancienne (in French). Paris: Le Cerf.
- Budge, E.A. Wallis (1905). The Egyptian Heaven and Hell. Londres: Kegan Paul, Trench, Trübner & Company.
- Carrier, Claude (2009). Grands livres funéraires de l'Égypte pharaonique (in French). Paris: Cybèle.
- Corteggiani, Jean-Pierre (2007). L'Égypte ancienne et ses dieux (in French). Paris: Fayard.
- Hornung, Erik (2007). Les textes de l'au-delà dans l'Égypte ancienne (in French). Monaco: Éditions du Rocher.
- Jacq, Christian (2010). Paysages et paradis de l'aure monde selon l'Égypte ancienne (in French). Paris: Maison de Vie éditeur.
- Monfort, Raymond. "Le sarcophage en albâtre de Sethy". sethy1.free.fr (in French).
- Meeks, Dimitri (1971). Le Seuil (ed.). "Génies, anges et démons en Égypte". Sources orientales VIII (in French). Le Seuil.
- Patricia Turner; Charles Russell Coulter (2001). Dictionary of Ancient Deities. Oxford University Press US. ISBN 978-0-19-514504-5.
