= Qed-her =

Ancient Egyptian minor gate deity

- Member of the Gate deities of the underworld
- Depiction of Qed-Her from the Tomb of Nefertari
- Weapon: Knives
- Region: Duat

Qed-her was an ancient Egyptian minor warrior and gate goddess of the underworld.

== Iconography ==
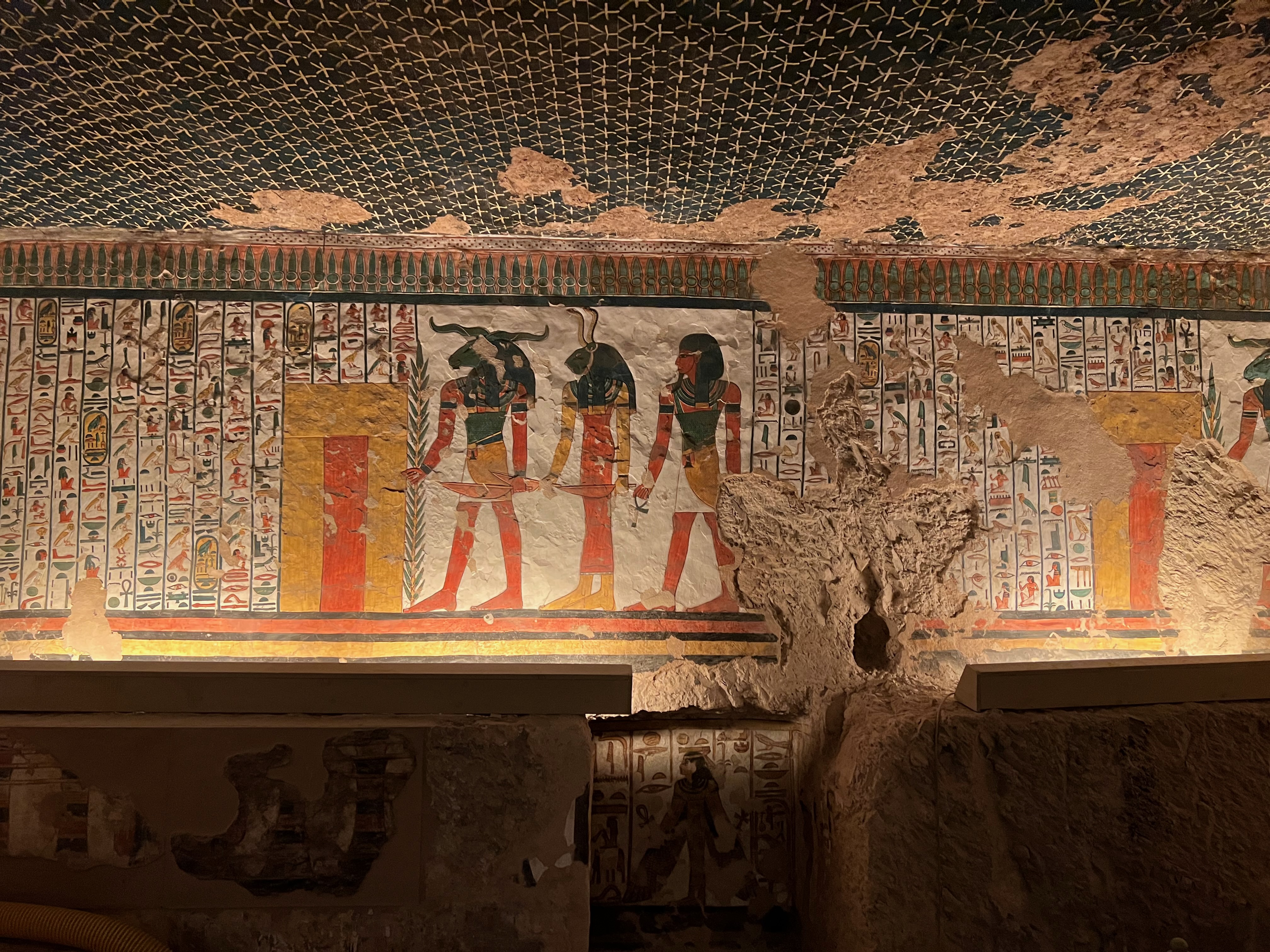
Qed-her depicted in the tomb of Nefertari (QV66)

Qed-her was portrayed as a woman with the head of a lioness with two snakes on her head and a knife in both hands.

== See also ==
- Nehebkau
- Sekhmet
- Tefnut
- Gate deities of the underworld
