= Gate deities of the underworld =

Ancient Egyptian deities

- the Gatekeepers of Aaru, ten of the many Gate deities of the underworld
- Region: Duat

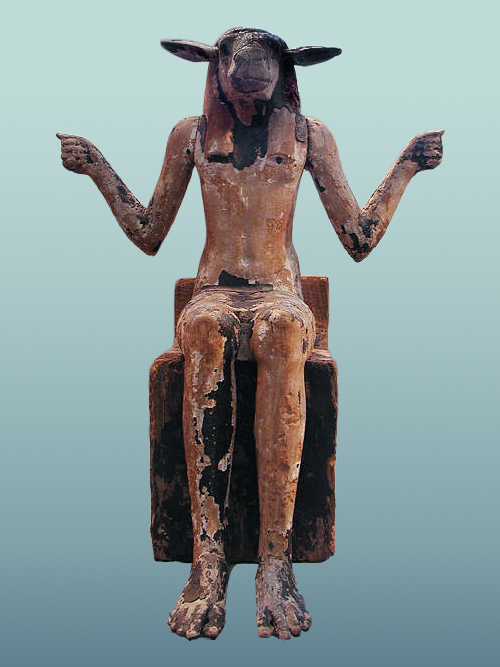
Wooden statue of a ram-headed creature of the underworld — from the tomb of Horemheb. British Museum, London.

The gate deities of the underworld were ancient Egyptian minor deities charged with guarding the gates of the Egyptian underworld.

== Description and partition ==
The Egyptians believed that in the netherworld, the Duat, there were various gates, doors and pylons crossed every night by the solar boat (Atet) of the sun-god Ra and by the souls directed to the world of the dead.

Ancient funerary texts provide many different descriptions of the afterlife gates. Sometimes more than 1,000 guardian deities are listed. According to a more general view, every gate was guarded by a minor god who allowed access only to the souls capable of pronouncing the secret name of the god himself, as a sort of "password". The walls of many Pharaonic tombs in the Valley of the Kings are decorated with the texts of the Book of Gates, which describes the twelve gates or pylons of the underworld: in spite of being imagined as architectural barriers to all intents and purposes, the gates were individually named as goddesses. Chapter 144 of the Book of the Dead mentions seven gates, each with its own God, a Doorkeeper and a Herald: for example, the 7th gate is guarded by the god "Sharpest Of Them All", by the doorkeeper "Strident Of Voice" and by the herald "Rejector Of Rebels".

Other funerary texts mention 21 "Secret Portals Of The Mansion Of Osiris In The Field Of Reeds" with their own names and epithets and protected by zoo-anthropomorfic deities often depicted crouched on the ground and holding large, threatening knives. The names of these last accesses — still feminine — are from time to time disturbing as the 14th ("Mistress Of Anger – Dancing On Blood") or harmless as the 3rd ("Mistress Of The Altar"). The guardian-gods too were given names that inspired terror and, above all, evoked their fearful powers: for example "Swallower Of Sinners" and "Existing On Maggots" — even if some texts avoided directly indicating their names, adding these largely unnamed gate deities of the underworld to the group of Egyptian divinities known to scholars, but impossible to inventory.

=== Gates described in the wall paintings of the Valley of the Kings ===
According to the descriptions provided by the wall paintings in regal tombs of the Valley of the Kings, each gate or pylon consisted of three elements: a) a spitfire snake placed in front of the access, b) the gate itself, described both as a true architectural portal and as a goddess, c) and its guardian deities. The solar boat's travel through such gates can be described as follows.

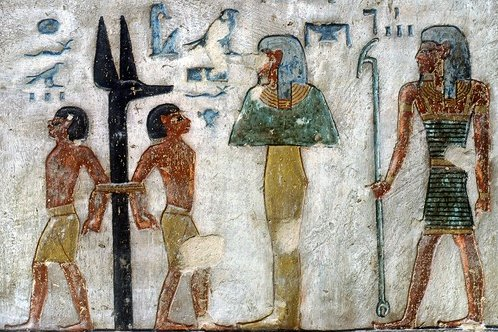
Illustration for the Book of Gates, 6th gate — scene from the tomb (KV11) of Pharaoh Ramesses III (c. 1186–1155 BCE).

1st gate: Sia (deification of perception) standing on the prow of the sun boat, invites a snake called "Desert-Protector" to unlock the gate to the arrival of Ra who, in the form of the god Atum (deification of the sunset sun), observes his enemies being massacred.

2nd gate: the guardian god is called "Swallower Of Sinners" and his gate precedes a lake of fire.

3rd gate: its guardian snake is "Stinger" while the portal itself is the goddess "Mistress Of Food"; some jackals watch over the "Lake of Life" interdicted to the dead because it is the place where Ra draws his breath.

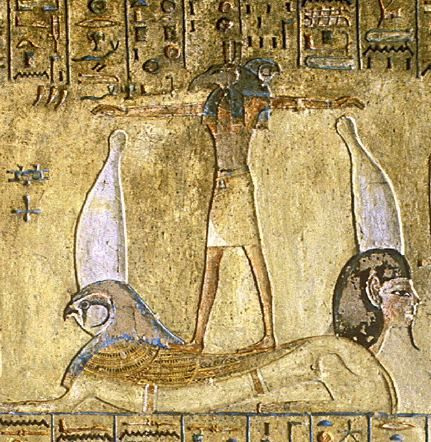
Illustration for the Book of Gates, 9th gate — scene from the tomb (KV17) of Pharaoh Seti I (c. 1290–1279 BCE).

4th gate: some deities carry ropes to measure the extension of the netherworld fields — as well as, in the daily life of the Egyptians, the measurement of the fields was carried out for tax purposes; this is also where the four human ethnic groups (according to the Egyptians) were depicted: the "cattle of Ra", i.e. Egyptians themselves, Levantines, Libyans, and Nubians.

5th gate: this gate is the goddess "Lady Of Duration" while its guardian serpent is "Flame-Eyed"; this access is inhabited by the perfidious demon Apep — embodiment of evil and chaos (Isfet), bitter enemy of Ra — here called "Evil Of Face". 20 deities manage to stem his devastating power by continuing to dissect it, while the heads of those he devoured emerge from his coils. The sun boat moves on and Ra leaves this dramatic region.

6th gate: Ra's boat approaches to seven jackal-headed poles with two enemies bound to each one, waiting to be beheaded.

7th gate: this gate is the goddess "Shining One" and beyond it there are 20 gods holding a rope ending in four whips, four falcon heads and four human heads. This is an enigmatic and barely understandable point.

8th gate: this access is inhabited by a flaming snake who burns up the enemies of Osiris.

9th gate: here stand Horus and Set on a hawk-headed lion.

10th gate: Apep appears again, but chained in order not to harm Ra in his transit.

11th gate: this gate is called "Mysterious Of Approaches" and is overseen by the cat-headed god Meeyuty (meow onomatopoeia).

12th gate: here stand the goddesses Isis and Nephthys in the form of snakes: the journey through the gates of the afterlife is finished and the sun rises on the world in the form of a sacred scarab (Khepri, deification of the morning sun).

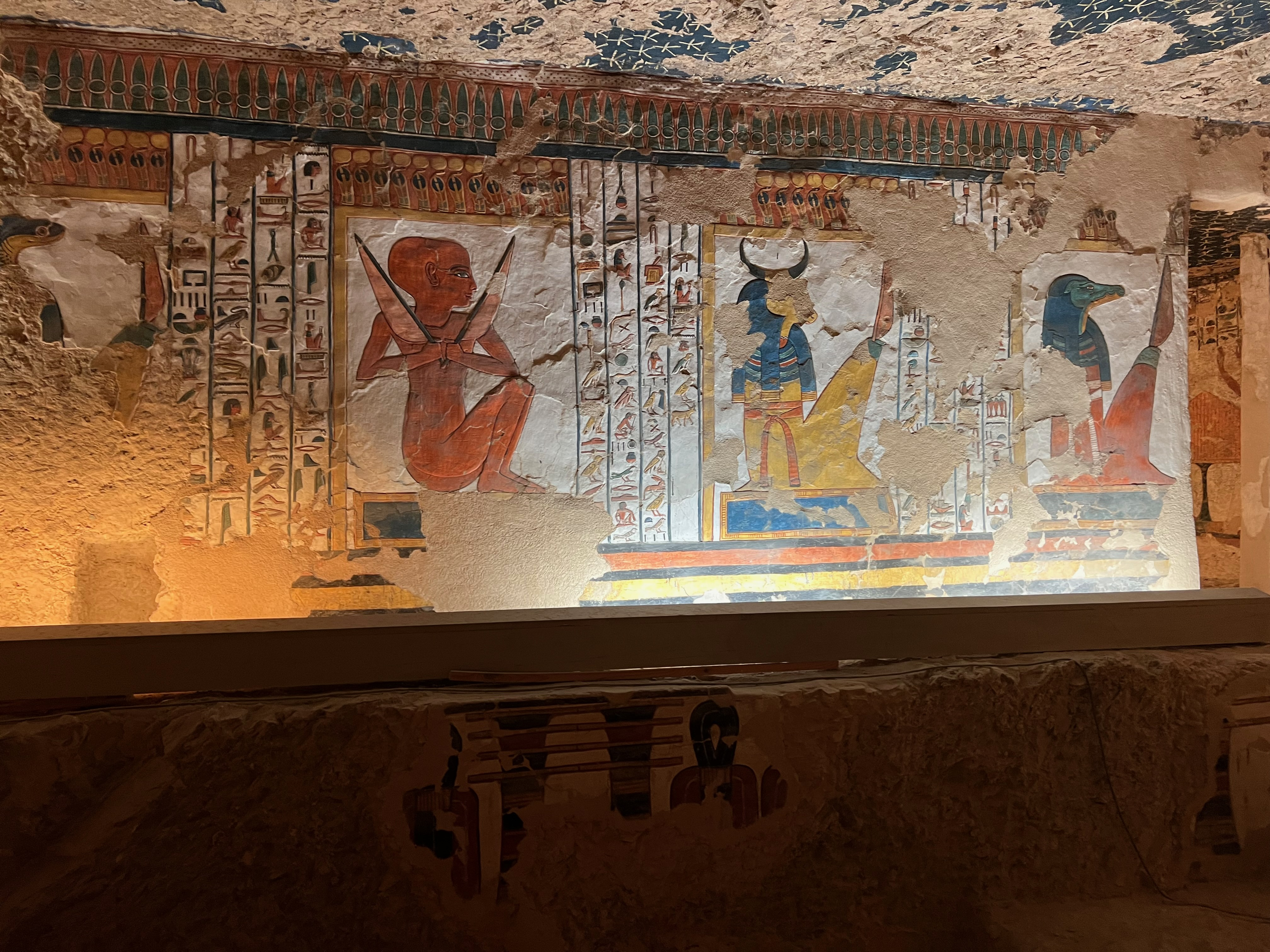
Gate deities depicted in the tomb of Nefertari (QV66)

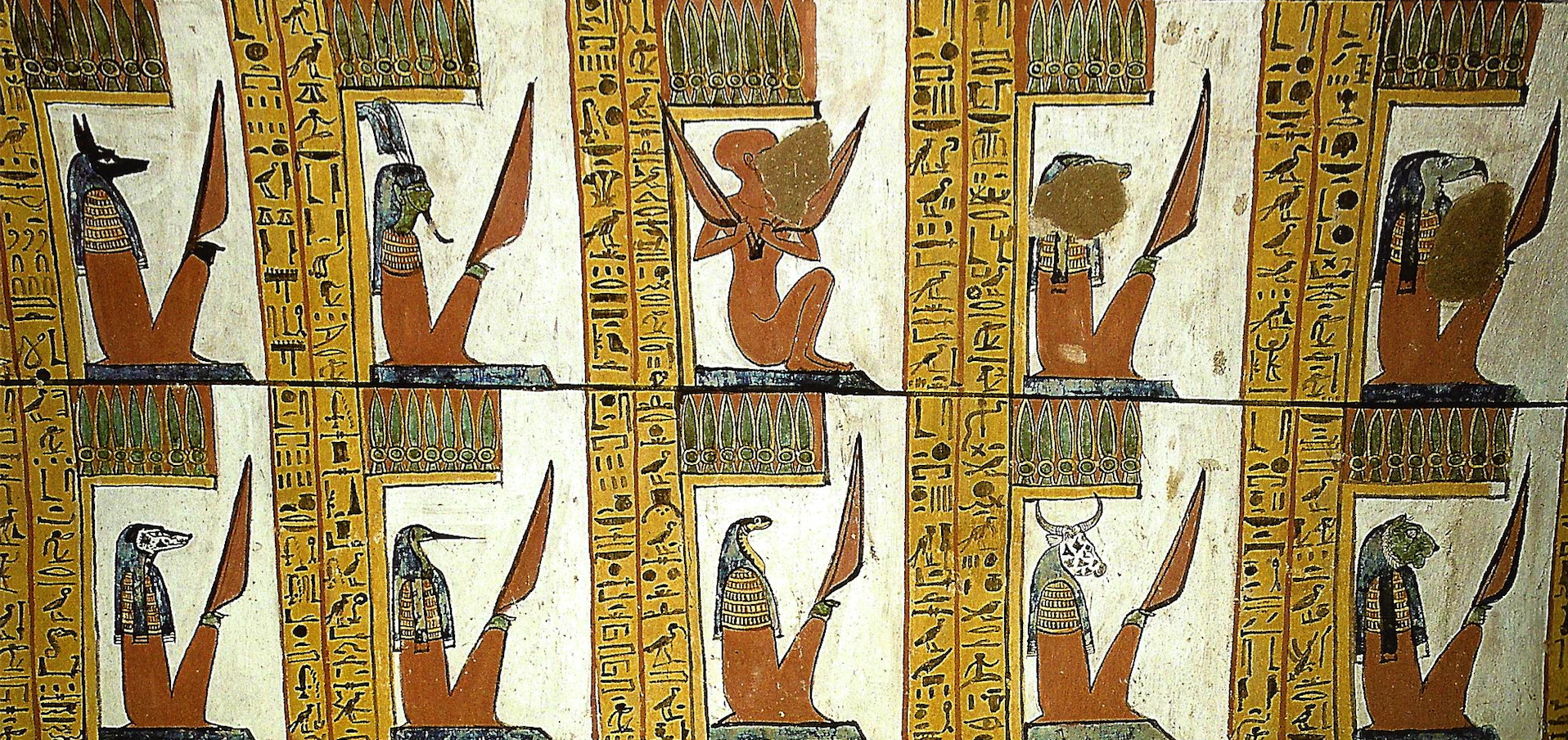
Gatekeepers of Aaru, painting on the southern wall of the tomb of Sennedjem in Dayr al-Madīnah, Thebes, Egypt,c. 1775 BCE.

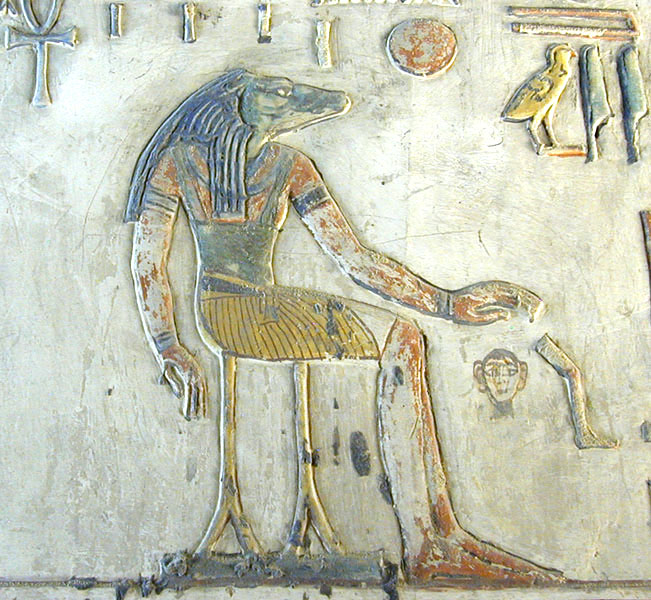
A crocodile-god guardian of the underworld — from the tomb (KV17) of Pharaoh Seti I.

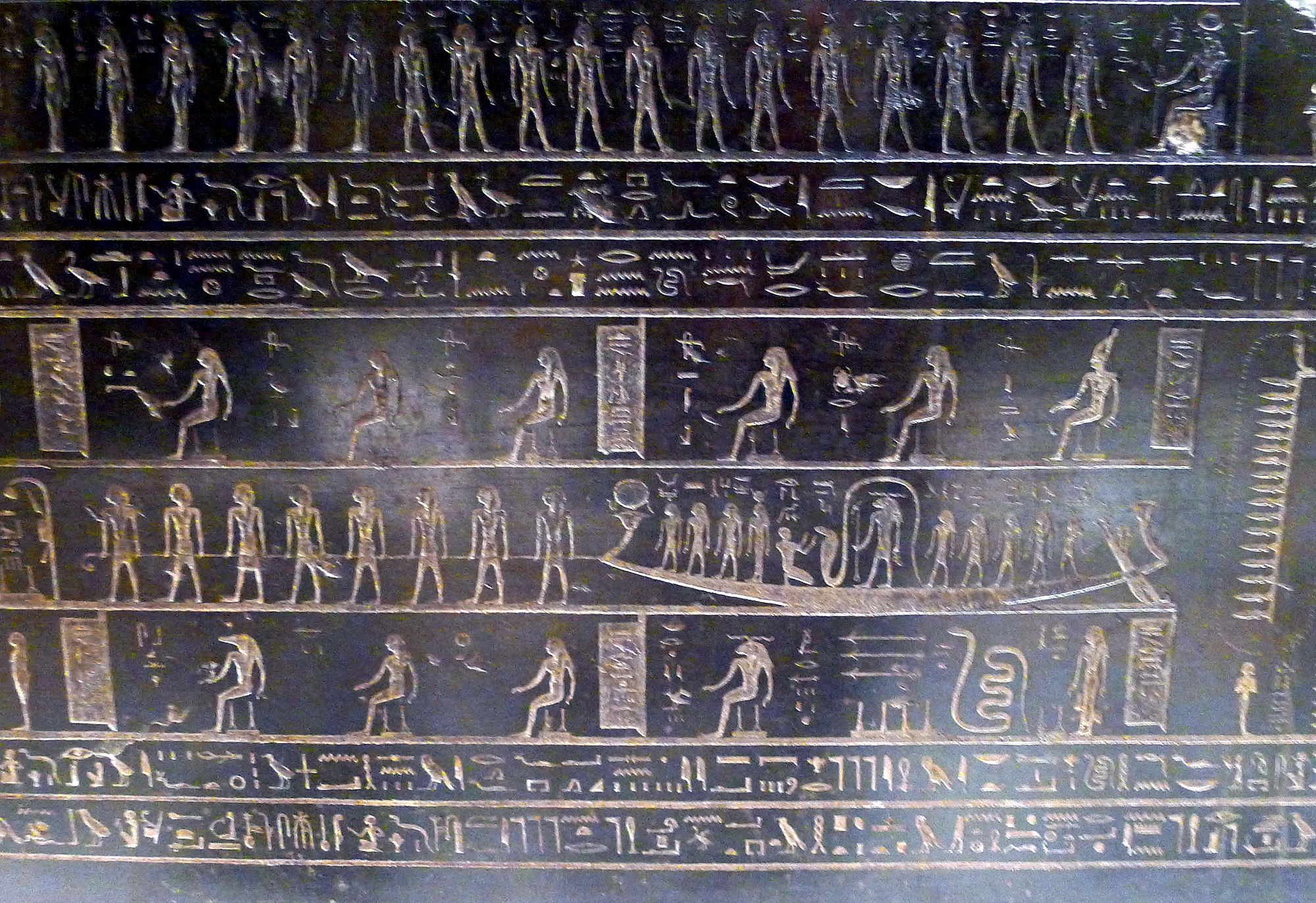
The journey of the solar boat of Ra through the gates of the netherworld and its deities — from a 4th century BCE sarcophagus. Louvre, Paris.

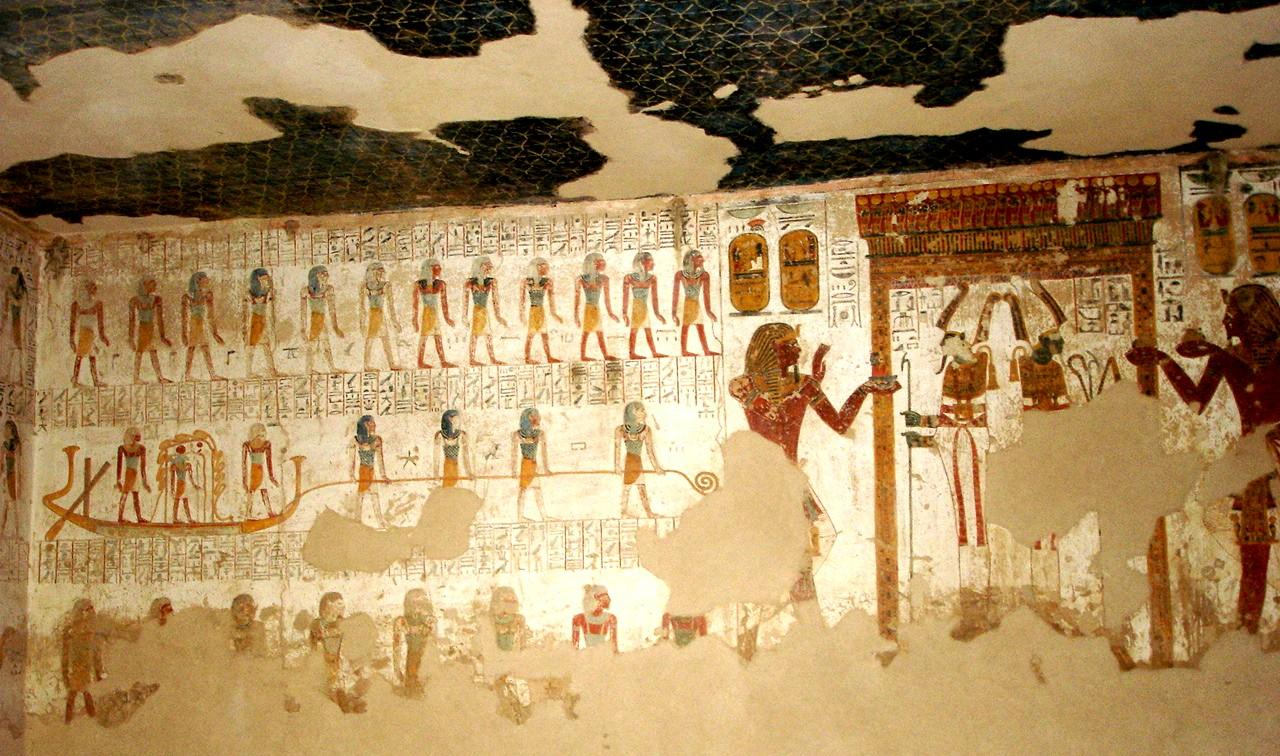
The journey of Ra among the underworld deities — from the tomb of Pharaoh Merneptah (c. 1213–1203 BCE).

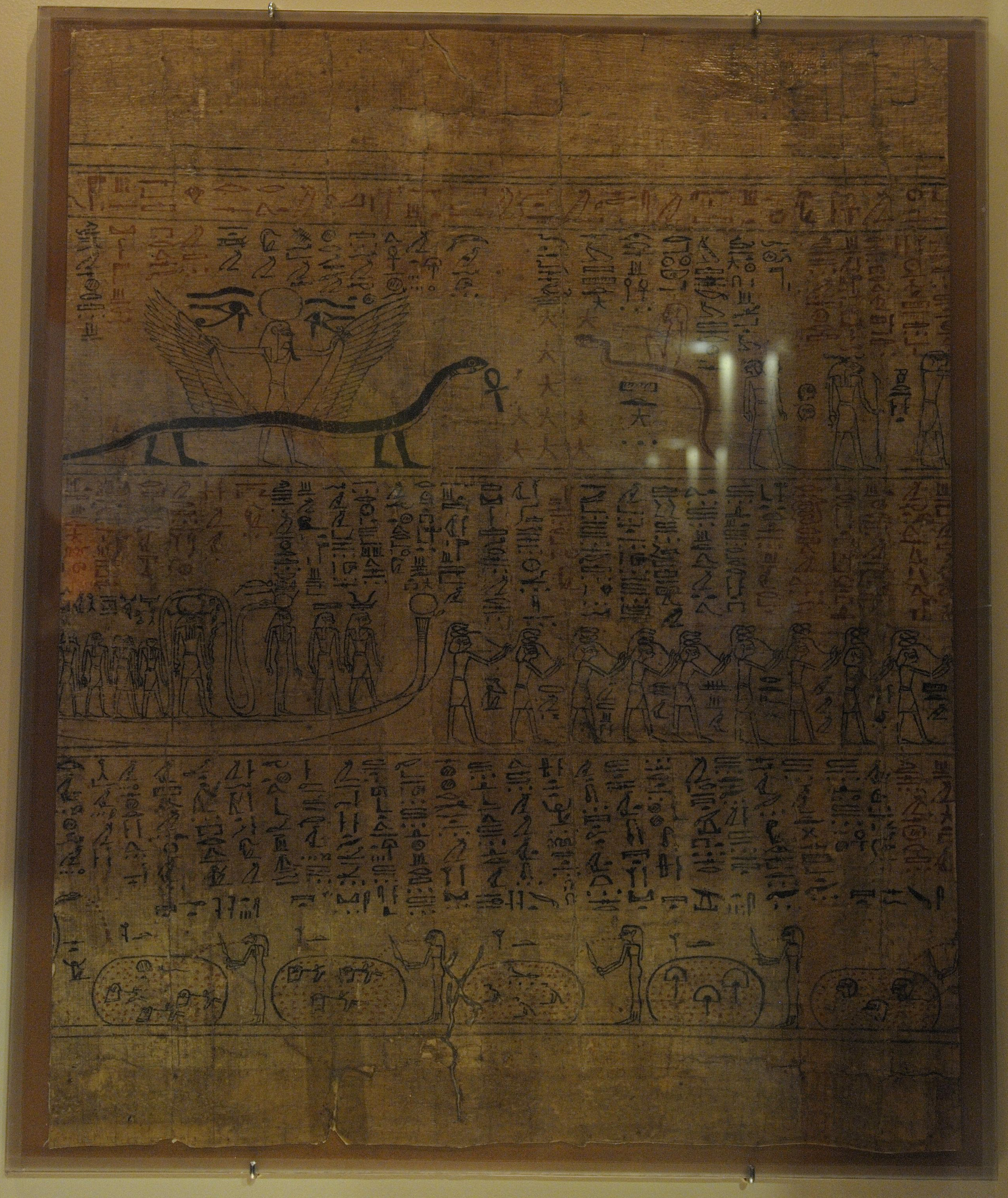
The 11th hour of the book Amduat.

=== Gates described in funerary papyri ===
The British Egyptologist George Hart thus outlined, in his Dictionary of Egyptian Gods and Goddesses (1986), the evocative names of these deities and their positions in the netherworld as described in the funeral papyri known to scholars:

==== Gods of the Seven Gates ====
Gate	God	Title	Doorkeeper	Herald
1		"Upside Down Of Face – Manifold Of Forms"	"Secret Listener"	"Miserable Of Voice"
2		"Stretched Out Of Forehead"	"Seqed (?) Faced"	"Glowing"
3		"Eater Of The Foulness From His Hindquarters"	"Watchful Of Face"	"Curser"
4		"Hostile Of Face – Loquacious"	"Perceptive"	"Great Of Face – Crocodile-Repeller"
5		"Existing On Maggots"	"Ashbu"	"Hippopotamus Face – Furious Of Onslaught"
6		"Raging Of Voice"	"Face-Eraser"	"Sharp Of Face"
7		"Sharpest Of Them"	"Strident Of Voice"	"Rebuffing Insurgents"

=== Deities of the Twenty-One Secret Portals of the Mansion of Osiris in the Field of Rushes ===
Portal	Name of Portal as Goddess	Guardian God
1	"Mistress Of Trembling"	"Dreadful"
2	"Mistress Of The Sky"	"Born Of The Hindquarters"
3	"Mistress Of The Altar"	"Cleanser"
4	"Powerful Of Knives"	"Long-Horned Bull"
5	"Fiery One"	"Killer Of Opponents"
6	"Mistress Of Darkness"	"Destroyer"
7	"Veiler Of The Weary One (Osiris)"	"Ikenti"
8	"Lighter Of Flames – Extinguisher Of Heat"	"Protector Of His Body"
9	"Foremost"	"Fowler"
10	"Piercing Of Voice" or "High Of Double Doors"	"Great Embracer"
11	"Ceaseless In Knifing – Scorcher Of Rebels"	"Cook Of His Braziers"
12	"Invoked By Her Two Lands"	"Cat"
13	"She Above Whom Osiris (or: Isis, Ennead) Stretches His Arms"	"Destroyer Of The Robber"
14	"Mistress Of Anger – Dancing On Blood"	"Screecher"
15	"Great Of Valour"	"Vigilant Of Face"
16	"Dread"	"Clever In Bowing"
17	"Great On The Horizon"	"Spirit"
18	"Lover Of Heat"	"Anointed"
19	"She Who Foretells Mornings Throughout Her Lifespan – Possessor Of The Writings of Thoth"	nameless
20	"Dweller Within the Cavern Of Her Lord"	nameless
21	"Sharpener Of Flint To Speak For Her"	"Giraffe" ("Memy")

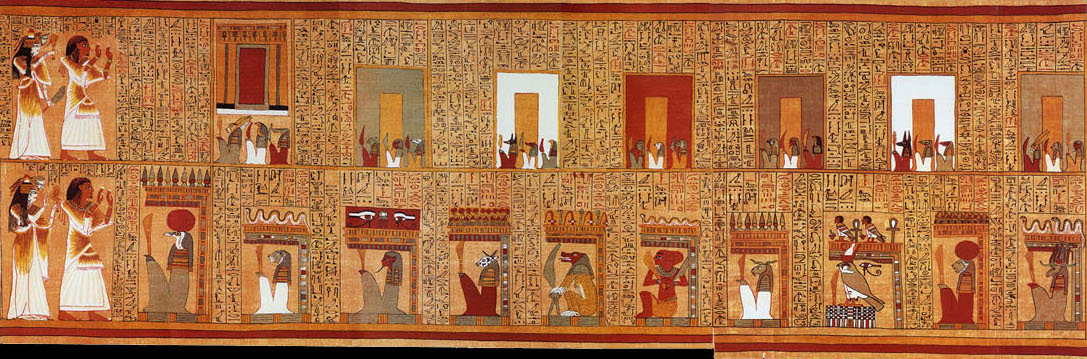
Two 'gate spells'. On the top register, Ani and his wife face the 'seven gates of the House of Osiris'. Below, they encounter ten of the 21 'mysterious portals of the House of Osiris in the Field of Reeds'. All are guarded by unpleasant protectors.

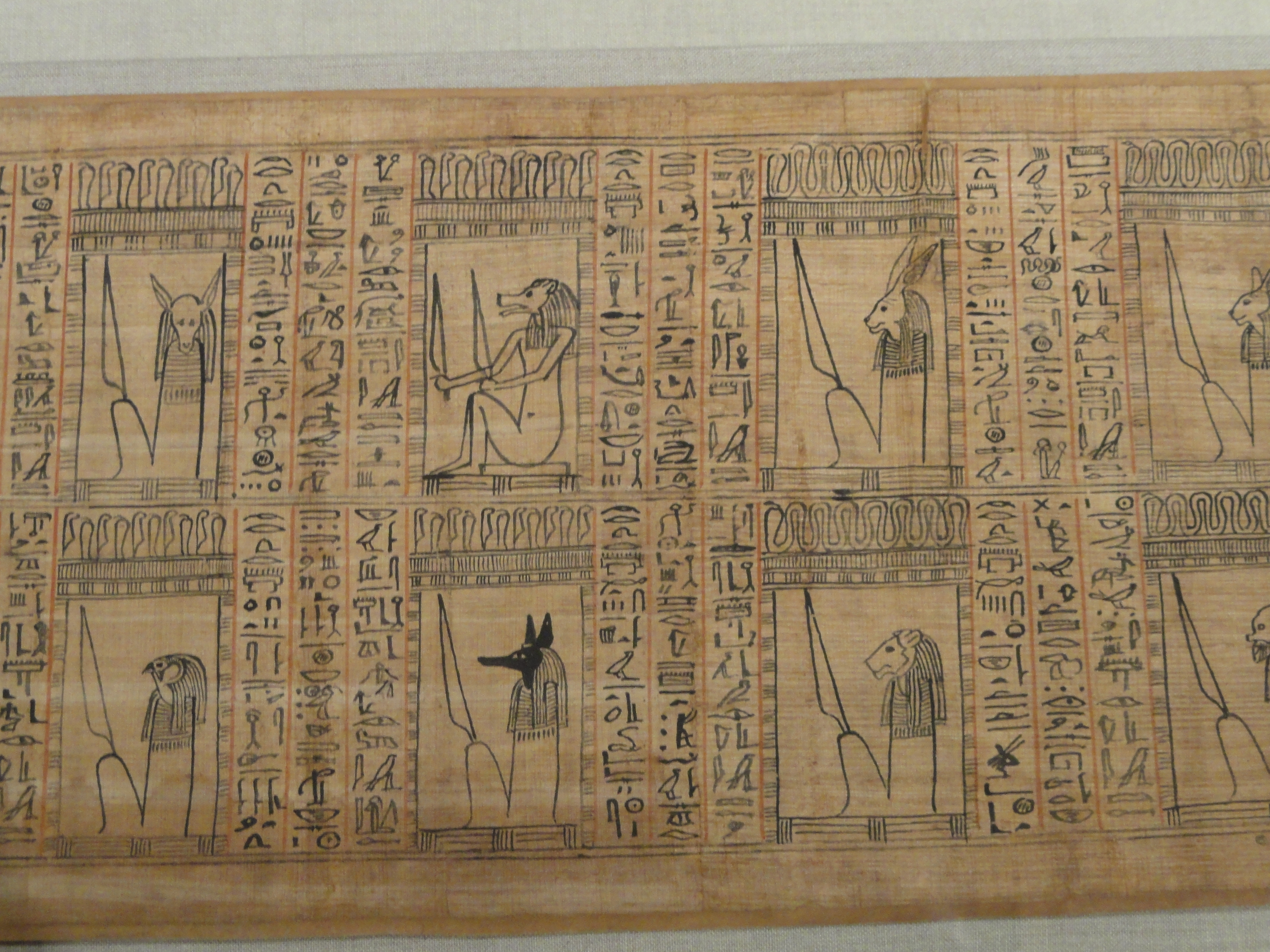
Book of the Dead of Hori: supernatural creatures guarding the netherworld. Cleveland Museum of Art, Cleveland.

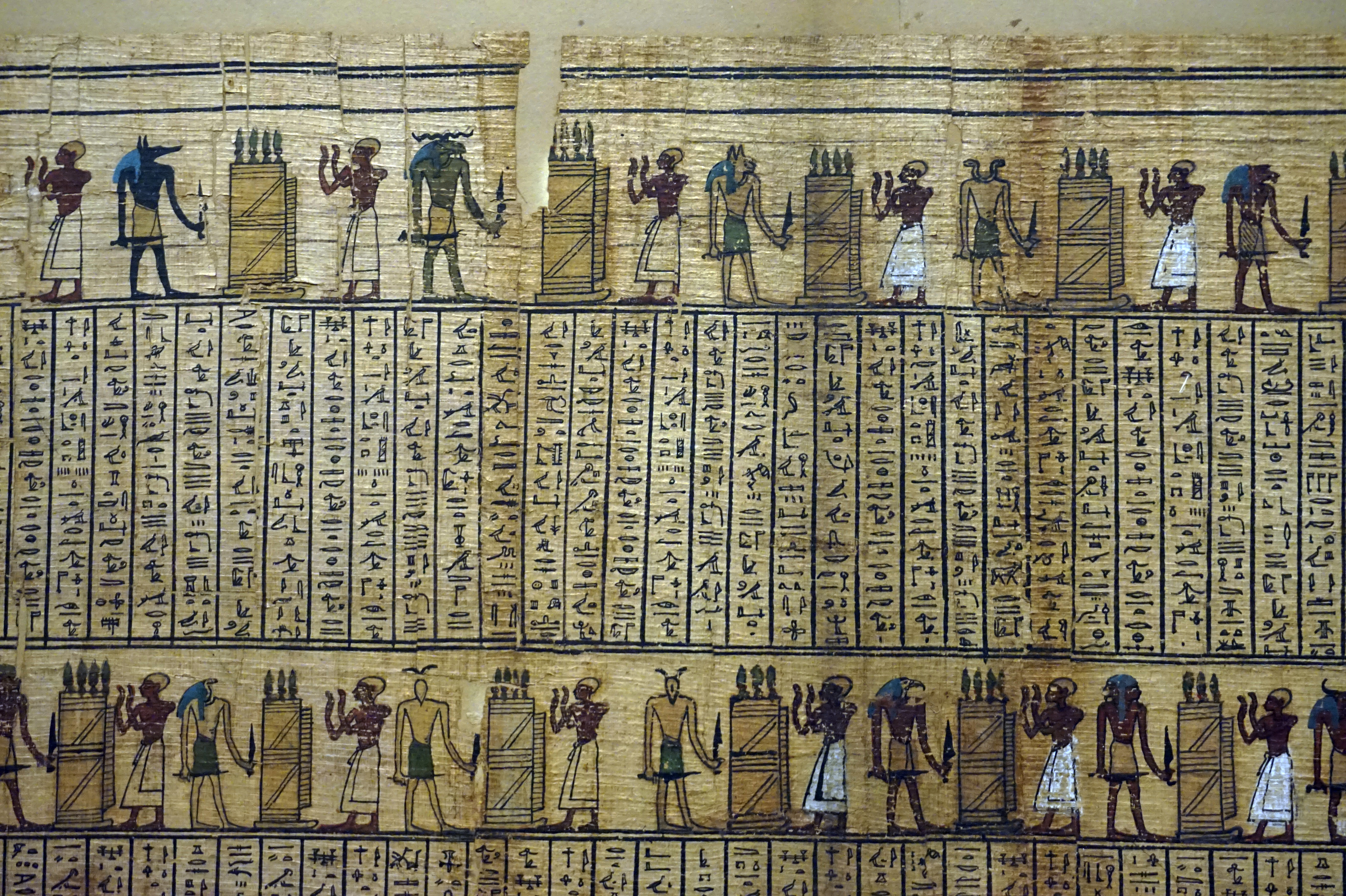
The deceased and the underworld monsters, from a Book of the Dead (N 3096). Louvre, Paris.

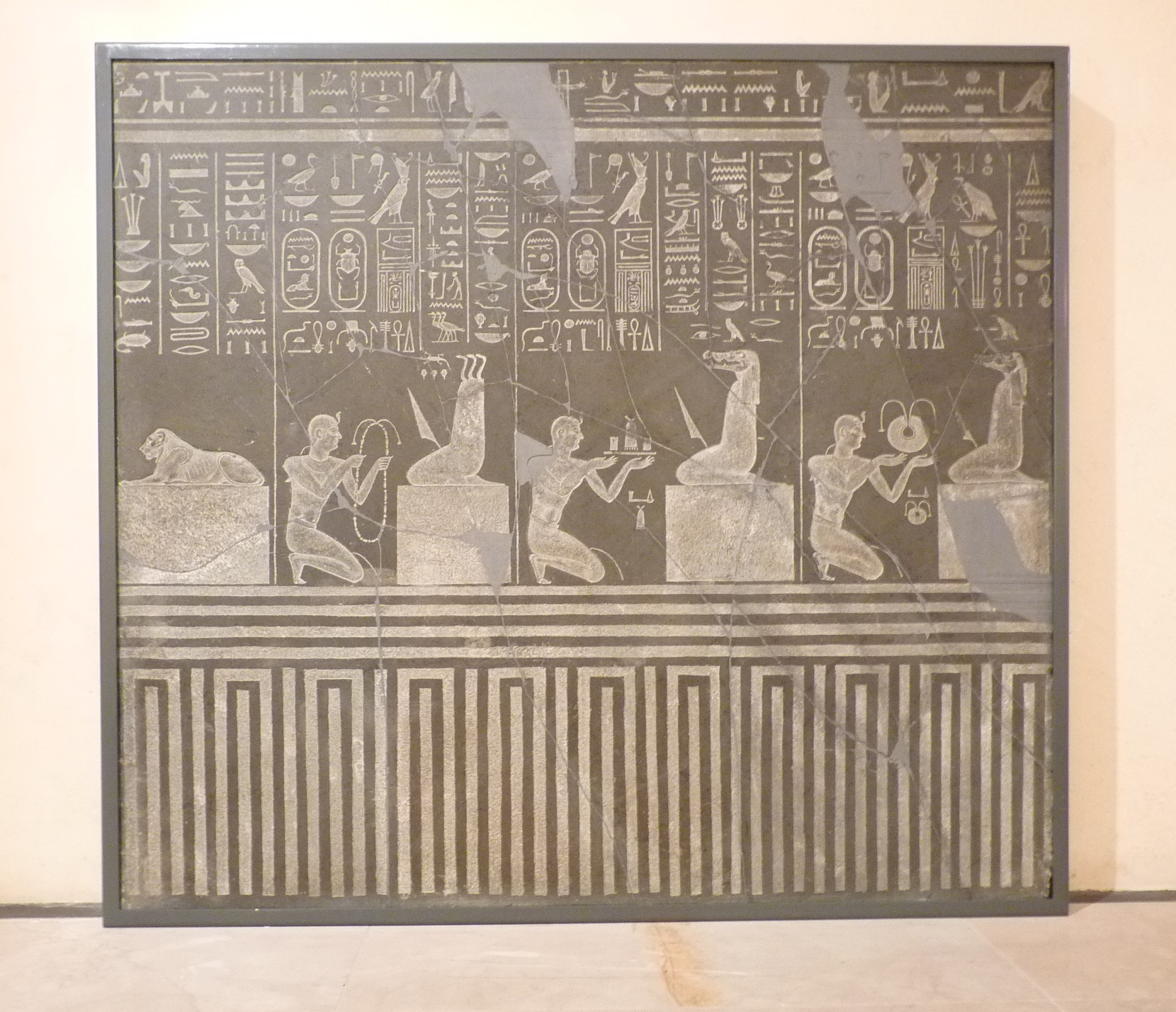
Pharaoh Nectanebo I (c. 379–361 BCE) adoring underworld demons. The Archaeological Civic Museum (MCA) of Bologna.

== See also ==
- Cavern deities of the underworld
- Qed-her
