= Cavern deities of the underworld =

Ancient Egyptian minor deities

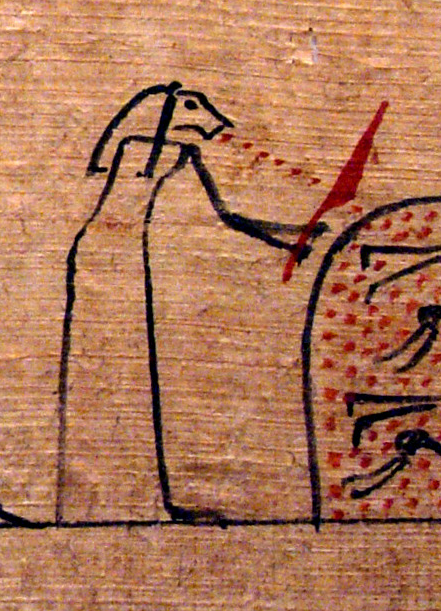
- Cavern deity depicted in a fragment piece of Funerary Papyrus of Amduat.
- Weapon: knives
- Region: Duat

The Cavern deities of the underworld were ancient Egyptian minor deities charged with punishing the damned souls by beheading and devouring them.

== Description and partition ==
The Egyptians believed that in the underworld, the Duat, there were at least twelve caves and caverns inhabited by terrible deities and supernatural creatures that would feed on the souls of the wicked. Several funerary papyri – in addition to the wall decorations of some tombs in the Valley of the Kings and the southern hall of the Osireion at Abydos – list these deities involved in the extermination (usually by beheading) of the enemies of the sun-god Ra and of his daughter Maat, goddess of truth and justice. In particular, these creatures are systematically listed in the "Spell of the Twelve Caves" known from a papyrus (Cairo 24742) dating back to the reign of Pharaoh Amenhotep II (c. 1427–1401 BC) of the 18th Dynasty.

The first seven caverns contained groups of three mummiform and three anthropomorphic deities, two male and one female in each triad. From the 8th to the 20th cavern, one would find divinities in variable numbers: in the 8th, for example, there were seven groups along with individual divinities, and at least twenty of them in the 9th. It is normal to find, next to the lists of names and positions of these other gods – beneath their representations – columns of offers prescribed for them too, along with the beneficent deeds that the dead would achieve. Once pacified, in fact, these deities could facilitate the free movement in the hereafter, providing nourishment and light in the darkness.

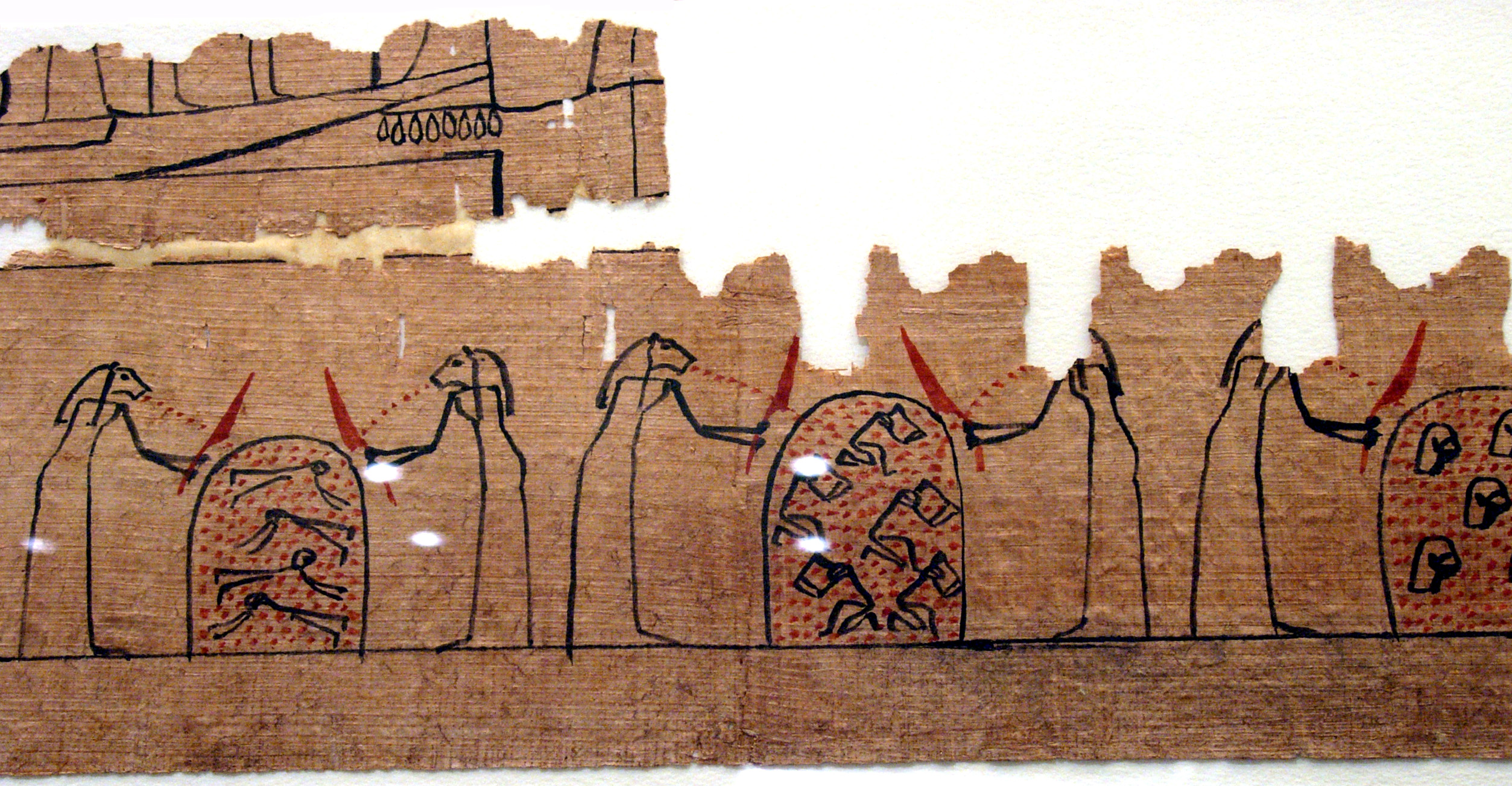
Scenes of otherworldly punishment from a papyrus of Amduat (21st Dynasty). Metropolitan Museum of Art, New York City.

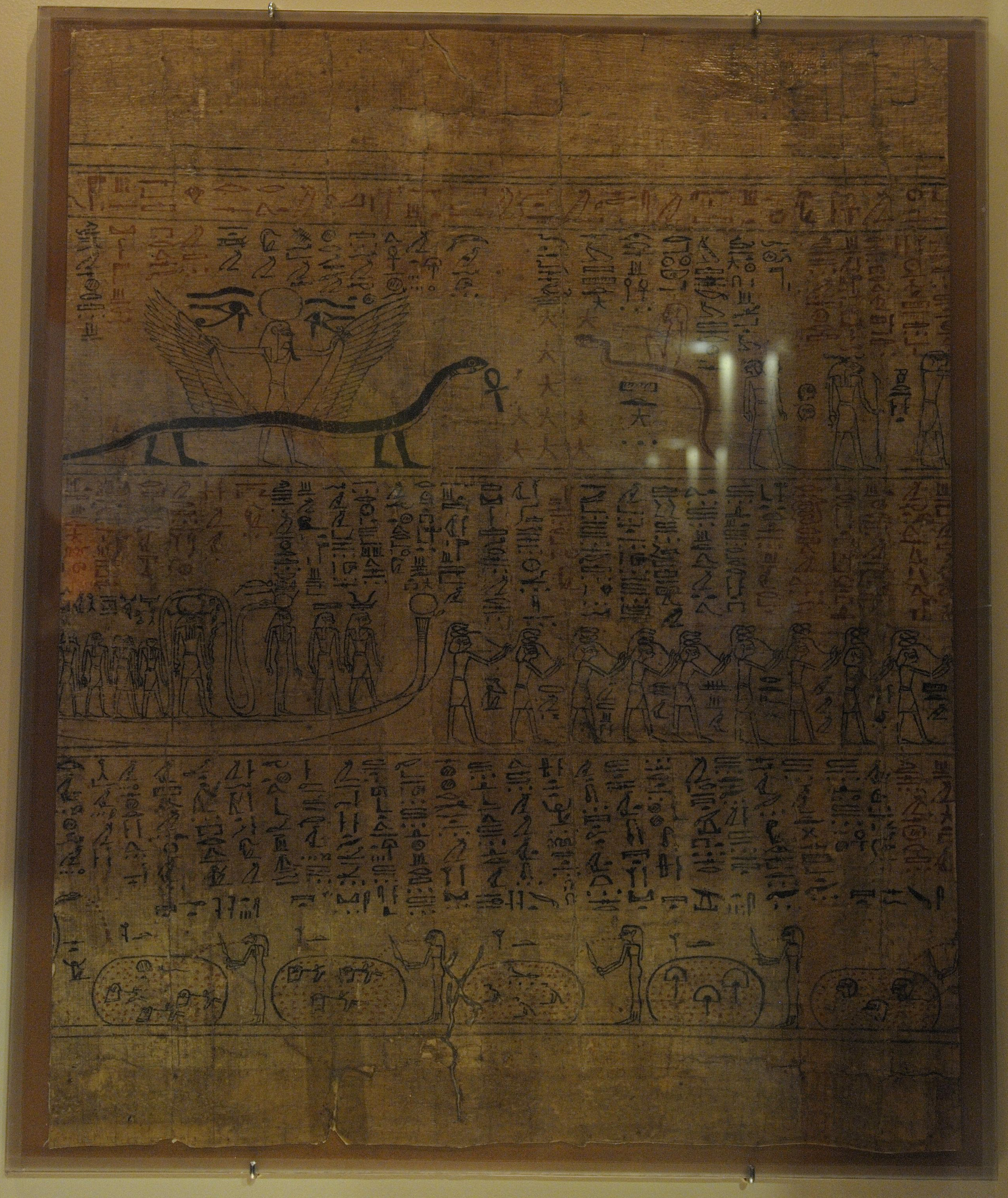
The 11th hour of the book Amduat, depicting (bottom) Cavern deities.

=== Deities of the first eleven caves (Hart) ===
The tomb (KV2) of Pharaoh Ramesses IV (c. 1155–1149 BC) in the Valley of the Kings, and the Book of the Dead, list the cavern deities hereafter selected by the British egyptologist George Hart:

Cavern	Deities	Cavern	Deities
1	a) nine jackal-headed deities feeding on rotten flesh b) snake deities guarding the "Silent Region"	7	/
2	a) spitfire-snake called Sesy b) primeval catfish-headed gods called Nariu	8	"Those Who Raise Their Superiors To The Sky"
3	a) Nehebkau b) nine catfish-headed gods led by Osiris	9	Gods of the Primeval Abyss
4	"Great One Who Is On His Belly"	10	Groaning goddesses with blood-dripping axes
5	a) Nut b) ithyphallic Osiris	11	Ammit
6	Tatenen	others	

=== Deities in the 10th cavern (Wilkinson) ===
In particular, the Egyptologist Richard H. Wilkinson thus grouped the deities and the supernatural creatures residing in the 10th cave, along with their beneficent deeds once the deceased successfully tamed them:

Deities	Beneficent deeds	Deities	Beneficent deeds
"Those Who Belong To The Sunshine"	Give the deceased light	The "Hidden Goddess"	Grants the soul be strong and the body be intact
"Those Who Take Hold"	Grant the deceased be acclaimed	"The Souls Of The Gods Who Became Members of Osiris"	Grant the deceased be in peace
"Nine Gods Who Guard Those In The Cavern"	Give the deceased the breath of life	"Those Who Worship Ra"	Grant the deceased not be rejected from any gate of the underworld
"Nine Gods Whose Arms Are Hidden"	Grant the deceased be worth and dignified	"Those Whose Faces Are Warlike"	Grant the deceased be cool in the hottest places of the netherworld

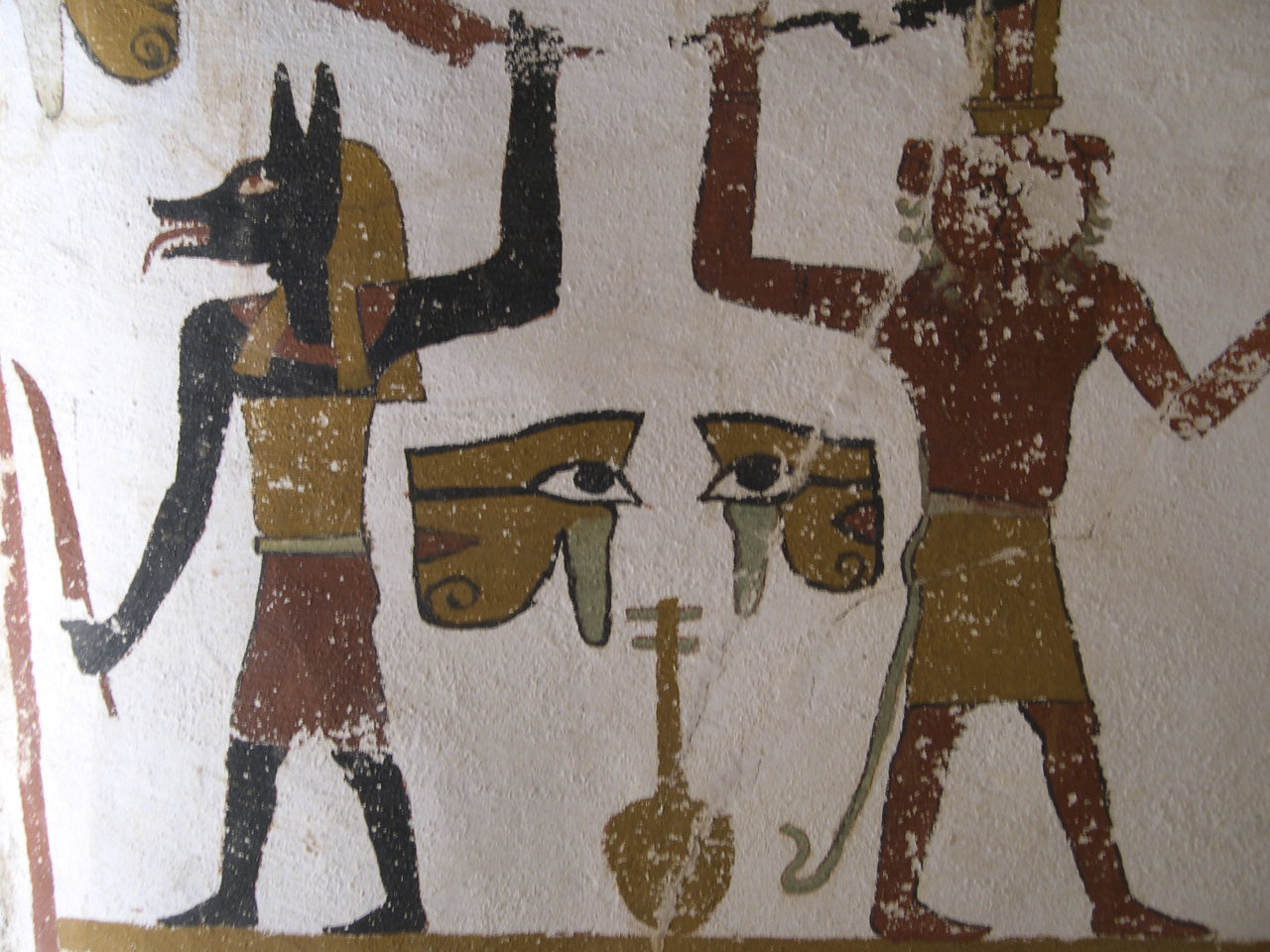
Jackal and lion-headed guardian deities with swords, from the Tomb of Sadosiris (El Muzawaka, Dakhla Oasis).

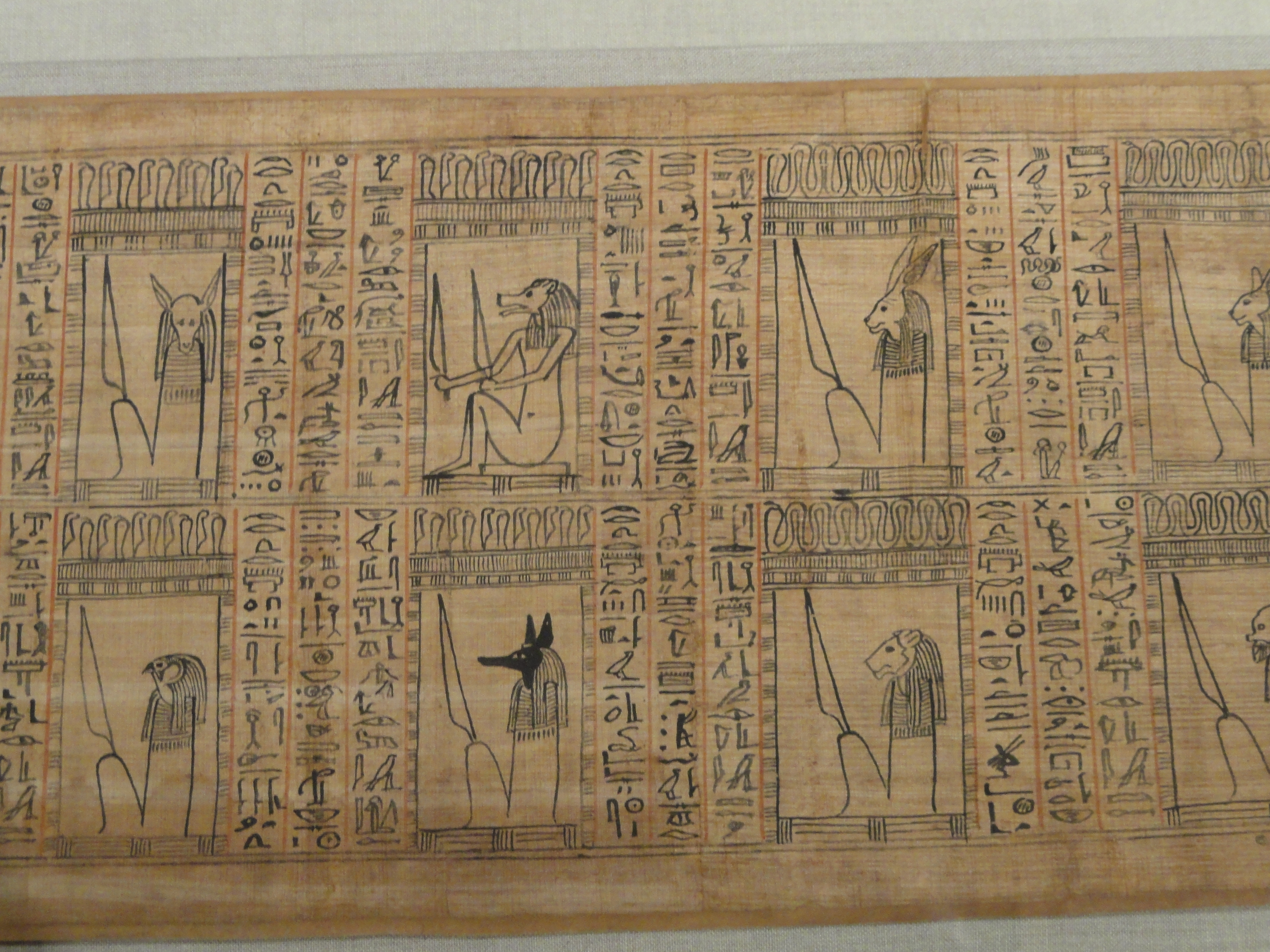
Book of the Dead of Hori: supernatural creatures guarding the netherworld. Cleveland Museum of Art, Cleveland.

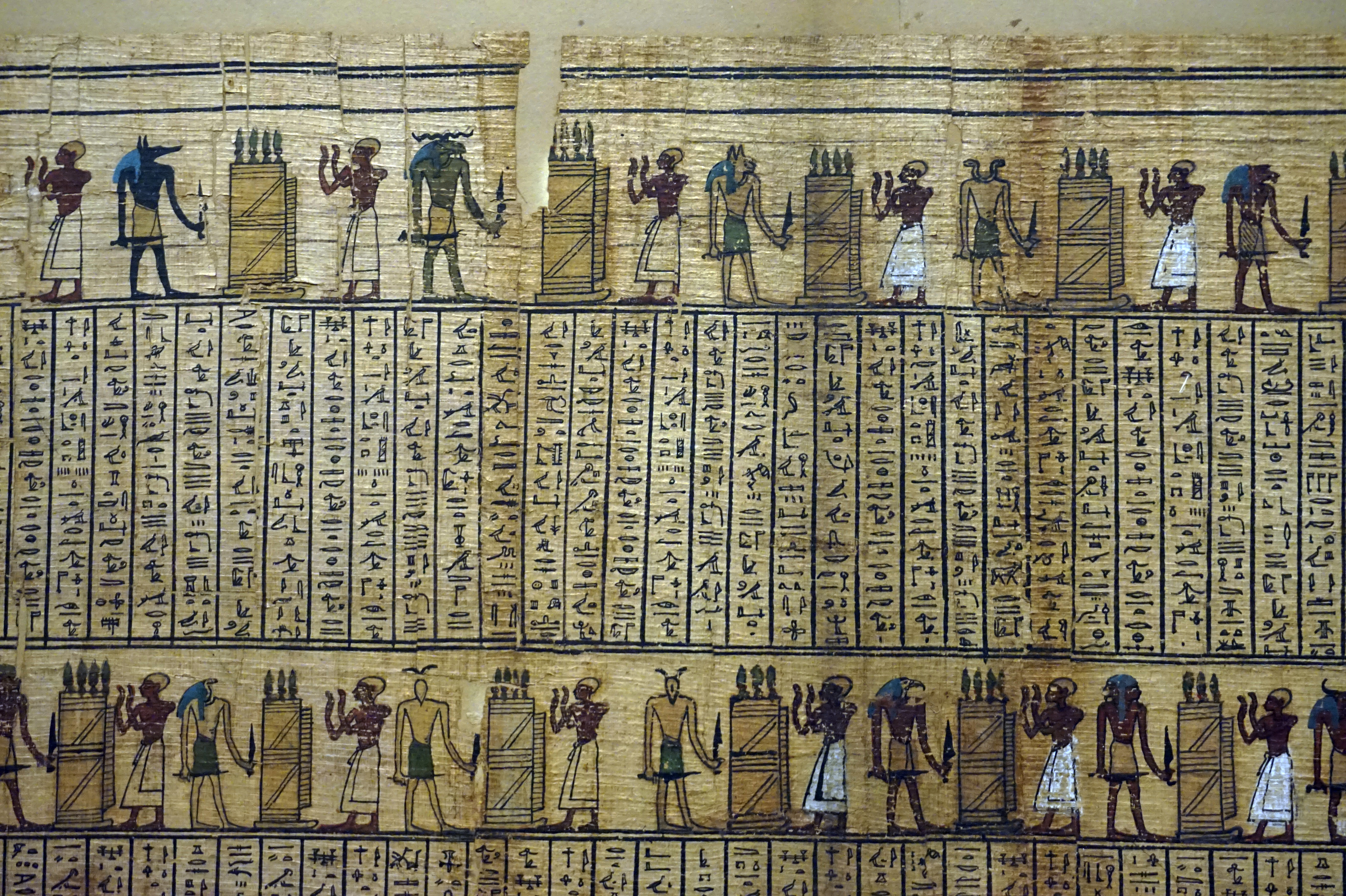
The deceased and the underworld monsters, from a Book of the Dead (N 3096). Louvre, Paris.

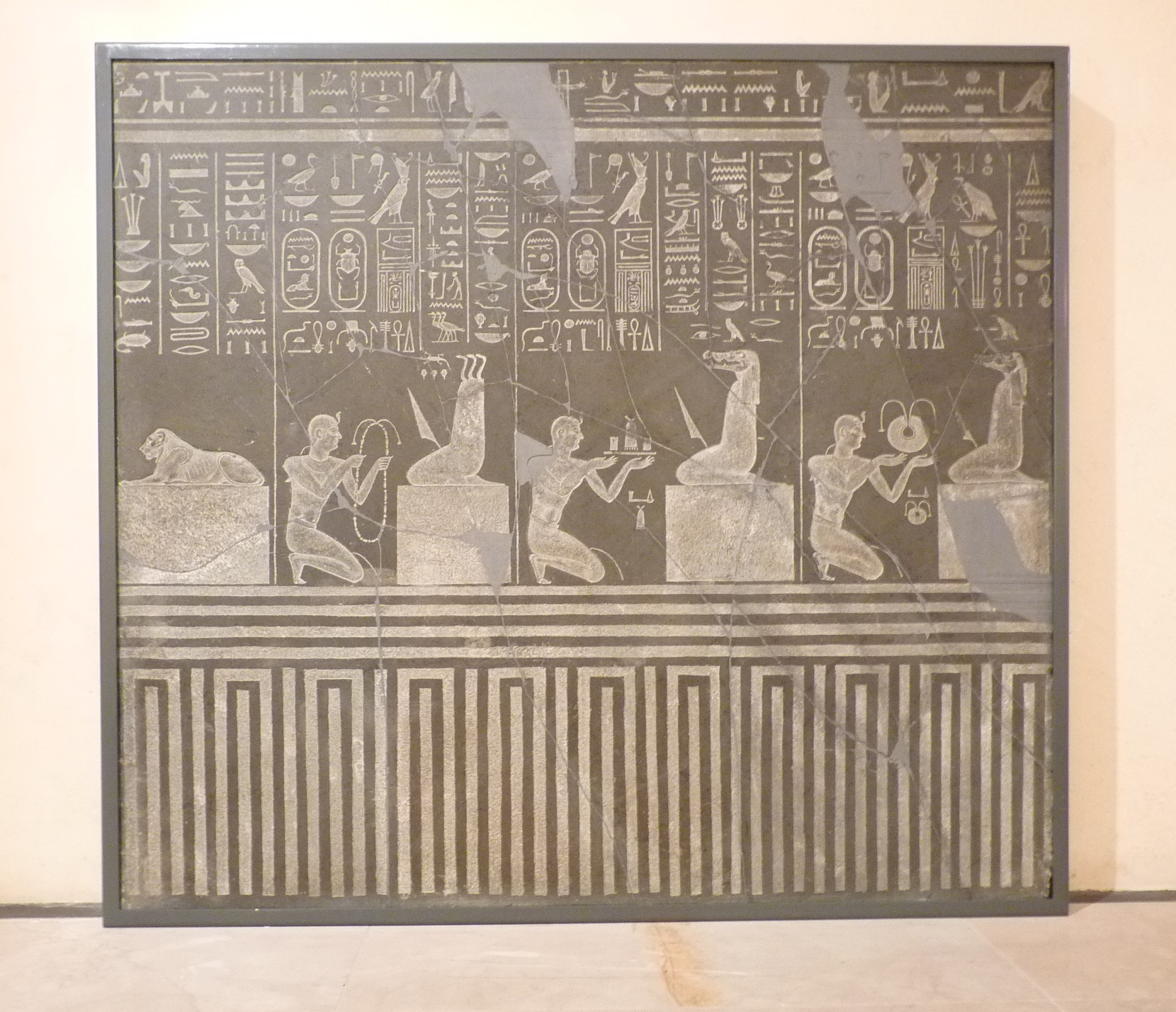
Pharaoh Nectanebo I (c. 379–361 BC) adoring underworld demons. The Archaeological Civic Museum (MCA) of Bologna.

== See also ==
- Gate deities of the underworld
