= Book of Gates =

Ancient Egyptian funerary text

The Book of Gates is an ancient Egyptian funerary text dating from the New Kingdom. The Book of Gates is long and detailed, consisting of one hundred scenes. It narrates the passage of a newly deceased soul into the next world journeying with the sun god, Ra, through the underworld during the hours of the night towards his resurrection. The soul is required to pass through a series of 'gates' at each hour of the journey. Each gate is guarded by a different serpent deity that is associated with a different goddess. It is important that the deceased knows the names of each guardian. Depictions of the judgment of the dead are shown in the last three hours. The text implies that some people will pass through unharmed, but others will suffer torment in a lake of fire. At the end of Ra's journey through the underworld, he emerges anew to take his place back in the sky.

== History ==
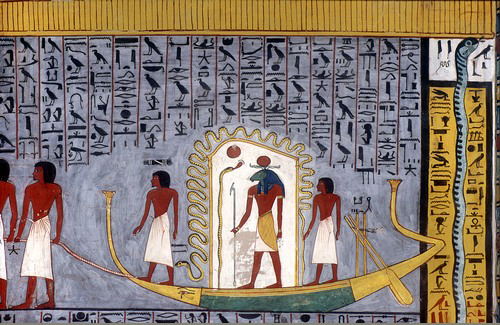
Ra traveling through the underworld in his barque, from the copy of the Book of Gates in the tomb of Ramses I (KV16).

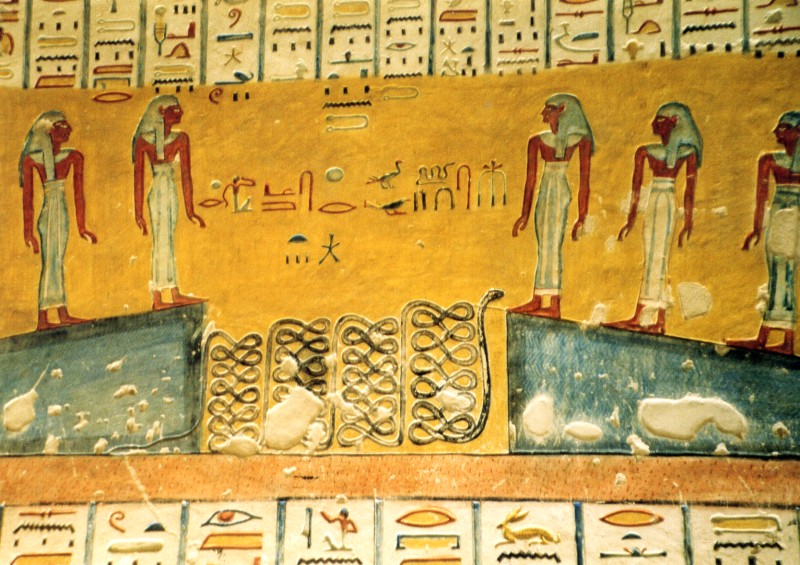
Part of a scene of the fourth hour of the Book of the Gates from KV, tomb of Rameses IV.

The text was not named by the Egyptians. It was named by French Egyptologist Gaston Maspero who called it 'Livre des Portes' (Book of Gates). Many scholars have studied, deciphered, and translated the book from Jean-Francois Champollion to Erik Hornung and Alexander Piankoff, the latter two being the ones to create the designation of hours and divisions, respectively.

It was discovered in tombs of the 19th and 20th Dynasties, but the earliest known appearance is in that of Horemheb in the 18th Dynasty, though this version is incomplete. Prior to its appearance in Horemheb's tomb, the Amduat was the commonly used funeral text among royals in their tombs.

== Appearances ==
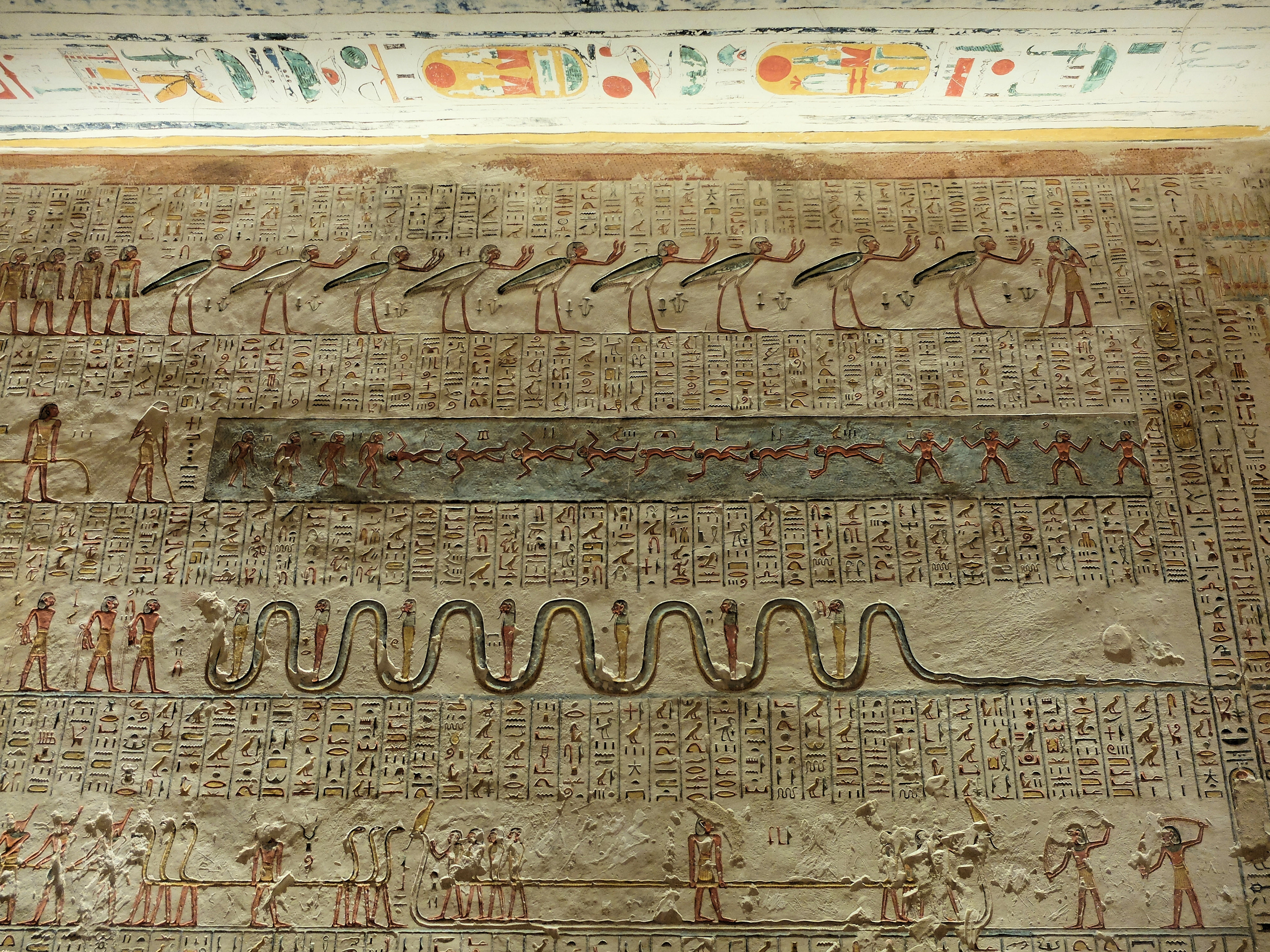
KV9, Tomb of Ramses V-VI. Fourth corridor, decoration on left wall: ninth division of the Book of Gates.

Various scenes from the Book of Gates have been depicted in many tombs from the New Kingdom ranging from Horemheb (d.c. 1295 BC) to Ramesses VII (d.c. 1130 BC). Seti I has the first complete inscription decorating his sarcophagus, as well as the first half of the book decorating the pillared halls of his tomb.

Horemheb has the earliest depictions of the Book decorating the walls of his tomb. The second through sixth hours are on the wall of his burial chamber. This was significant because it broke the traditional use of the Amduat usually displayed on walls of burial chambers prior to Horemheb.

In many of the tombs, partial scenes from the Book of Gates are inscribed on the pillared walls, like in Ramesses II’s tomb. Other kings, like Ramesses VII, only had selections from the hours depicted in their tombs.

They also appear in the tomb of Sennedjem, a worker in the village of Deir el-Medina, the ancient village of artists and craftsmen who built pharaonic tombs in the New Kingdom, and in the tomb of Tjanefer, a priest of Amun.

The Book was less popular to display in tombs of people of non-royal lineage. They tended to depict the Book of the Dead but it wasn't uncommon to find the Book of Gates alongside it. In some cases, only a few scenes were depicted interspersed with the Book of the Dead.

== Relationship to the Amduat ==
Closely related to the Book of Gates is the Book of Amduat (also known as The Book of the Hidden Chambers), which also follows Ra's journey through the underworld but with some differences. It accompanies the Book of Gates in many tombs because it is a guide to the deceased's souls journey and the deities it will encounter in the Underworld. According to Mohamed Ragheb Dardir, the main difference between the books' purpose is that the Book of Gates acts as a guide about the dangers that the deceased soul will encounter and what must be done to pass through each gate in order to be resurrected. It is believed the books are both often depicted in tombs because on their own, they are not a sufficient guide for the soul to complete its journey with Ra.

The biggest difference between the Book of Gates and Amduat are the serpent gate deities guarding the doorway for each hour. These doorways and serpents are named throughout the journey and need to be named in order to cross into the next hour. On the other side of each door are two more guardians and uraei that emit fire. The Book of Going Forth by Day also contains similar doorways in the underworld.

The gods that make up the crew of the solar barque are different between the Amduat and the Book of Gates. In the Amduat, the solar barque is larger, whereas in Book of Gates, the crew is made up of only Heka and Sia. These are the only two who are in the boat with Ra along the entire journey through the underworld.

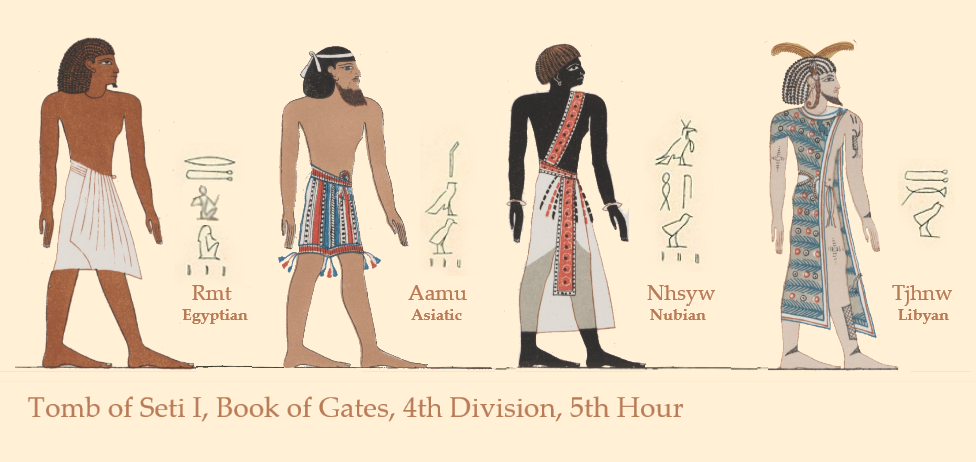
Illustration of figures from The Fourth Division of the Fifth Hour at the Tomb of Seti I depicting: an Egyptian, Asiatic, Nubian and Libyan.

== The Hours of the Book of Gates ==
The hours of the Book of Gates follow Ra's journey across the underworld during the 12 hours of the night. Ra leads the deceased soul through a series of gates to reach his resurrection. The soul must get past each gate deity by knowing their name and attributes. The Book of Gates is a series of one hundred images broken into three registers for each hour depicting the journey. Each image is accompanied by text describing the details of each register.

At the end of each hour, the deceased soul encounters a ‘gate’ guarded by a serpent deity that they must know the name and characteristics of in order to pass through unharmed.

Hour 1: This is Ra's arrival into the underworld and greeted by the “gods of the west” which refers to the Western Horizon. This scene depicts Ra in the scarab god form of Kephri who is surrounded by a snake god for protection on his solar barque. The solar barque is sailing through the mountains depicted in the scene. There are also images of standards, one with a jackal head and one with a ram, held by bearded gods Set and Tat.

This hour is different from the others because it is the only scene where Ra and the deceased soul are not in the underworld.

Hour 2: Once the boat passes between the Western Mountain, it reaches the door to the second division. This door is guarded by the serpent Saa-Set. The door itself is named Watcher of the Desert. The accompanying texts speaks of the darkness beyond the door until the god manifests in his godly form. Surrounding the boat are bound men guarded by Atum. The text refers to these men as ‘damned’ and ‘blessed’ by Ra, where they are to either take their place in the afterlife (the blessed) or be destroyed by the serpent (the damned). The blessed make offerings to the doorway of the serpent named Winding One, guarding the next door.

Hour 3: Just beyond the door, named Piercing of Embers,” are twelve mummies who are protected by a fire-breathing snake at the front and back of the corridor. Ra demands the fire penetrate the dark corridor where it illuminates a Lake of Fire that the mummies are surrounding. The solar barque crosses the lake and the other side, Ra calls for the mummies to unwrap themselves and a be given breath and offerings for pulling the solar barque. The accompanying texts states Ra asks for safe passage across the lake of fire for the worthy blessed souls. Once the boat reaches the next gateway, the entire scene is drenched in darkness again.

Hour 4: Once through the gate, Ra is bathed in darkness. The barque is pulled along by four gods until it reaches building containing nine shrines that contain nine mummified gods. These are the ‘gods who follow Osiris, who are in their abodes.’ These gods protect the ba. In front of this shrine house are two groups of six goddesses guarding a hill to land, on the left, and one to water, on the right, separated by a giant serpent. The land on the left shows Osiris mummified, behind Osiris are twelve gods guarding pits of fire. The right path over water is the Lake of Life.

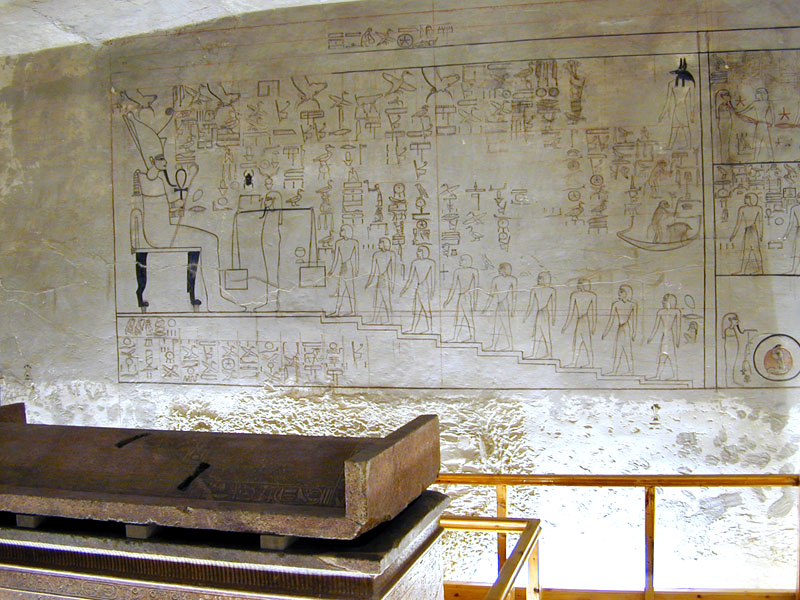
On the wall, evocation of the 5th division of the Book of Gates: the court of Osiris.

Hour 5: This is the Judgement of Osiris scene. The solar barque is pulled along by the four gods of the Tuat (duat or underworld). They are pulling the bark towards nine gods holding a long serpent named Ennutchi who is the god Apep. In front of these nine gods are twelve additional gods deemed “the souls of the men who are in the Tuat.” Ra instructs these gods to attack the serpent so it is not able to travel through the gateway. In the next sequence of the scene Horus is depicted presiding over the men the four ethnicities of man: Egyptian, Asiatics, Nubian, Libyans (sixteen in total). These groups represent how all are welcoming in the afterlife. Horus grants protection of the men and gives them offerings. There is another gateway which leads to the Judgement Hall of Osiris. This is where Osiris weighs the soul of the deceased against evil.

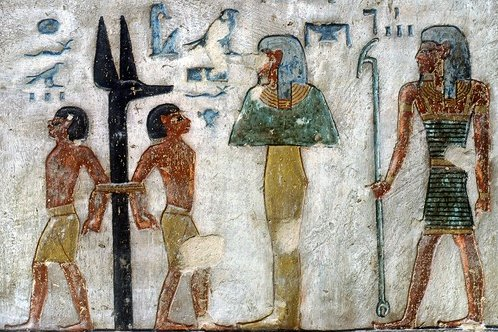
Book of Gates, sixth division (P)/seventh hour (H), middle register, scene 45: enemies bound to jackal-headed pillar. Scene from tomb of Ramses III. (KV11)

Hour 6: Once he has been judged, Ra passes through the gateway. There, Ra is rejoined with his ba. In this scene we see mummies with tridents protecting Ra from the serpent Apep as he is reuniting with his ba. As Ra rejoins his ba he breathes life into the mummies that guard him, granting them their resurrection. At the end of the scene Ra casts his enemies into the flames of the Lake of Fire.

Hour 7: Ra passes through the gate guarded by "One Who Seizes with His Eye." In this scene Ra comes before twelve men who carry ma ’at feathers depicting they have been judged to be true and good. These twelve are offered libations for the afterlife. It is also depicted that those that were judged to be evil are tied to jackal-headed stakes of Geb, awaiting their punishment. The scene also shows those that have been judged as true tending to fields of grain with Ra presiding over them. This represents the manifestation of a bountiful harvest year in the upperworld.

Hour 8: The next gate Ra passes is guarded by nine gods just inside the door. The serpent guarding the door is named “Closed of Eye.” Through the door, Ra is greeted with deities holding a long rope from Aken. These rope bearers bring forth the hours of the day. They tie up Aken and give praise to Ra.

Hour 9: Ra passes through the gateway guarded by “Flaming of Face.” The doorway itself is named “Glowing One.” Passed the door Ra comes to an Island of fire and the Waters of Nun which has people floating in it, they will be restored and given breathe when they emerge. The island of fire is depicted for Horus to burn those that he has condemned, those who have done evil against the sun god.

Hour 10: Ra progresses through this scene trying to defeat Apep. At the end of the scene, Apep is captured by the gods standing before the solar barque, holding nets. In this hour, is also a reconciliation between Horus and Seth which symbolizes the uniting of Upper and Lower Egypt under the sun god as begins to rise over the lands and bring a new day.

Hour 11: Apep is still captured and punished in this scene by Horus’ four sons and Geb. After the destruction of Apep, Ra is surrounded by all types of deities for protection that pull him along the sky. As Ra comes to the gate, there are two scepters, one labeled Osiris and the other Horus. The writing by the scepters speaks praise of Ra and tells of his soul and body in heaven and earth, respectively.

Hour 12: Ra exits the afterworld. The scene shows many figures holding various objects from scepters to stars to disks. They represent various aspects of helping Ra take his place during the daytime hours. Ra passes Apep being punished again by the Ennead, nine gods who helped Ra along his journey. Once Ra passes through the final gate of the underworld, he is in the waters of Nun, who lifts the boat up. Ra is once again in the form of Khepri. Nun raises the solar barque into the awaiting arms of Nut.

== The Fourth Division of the Fifth Hour ==
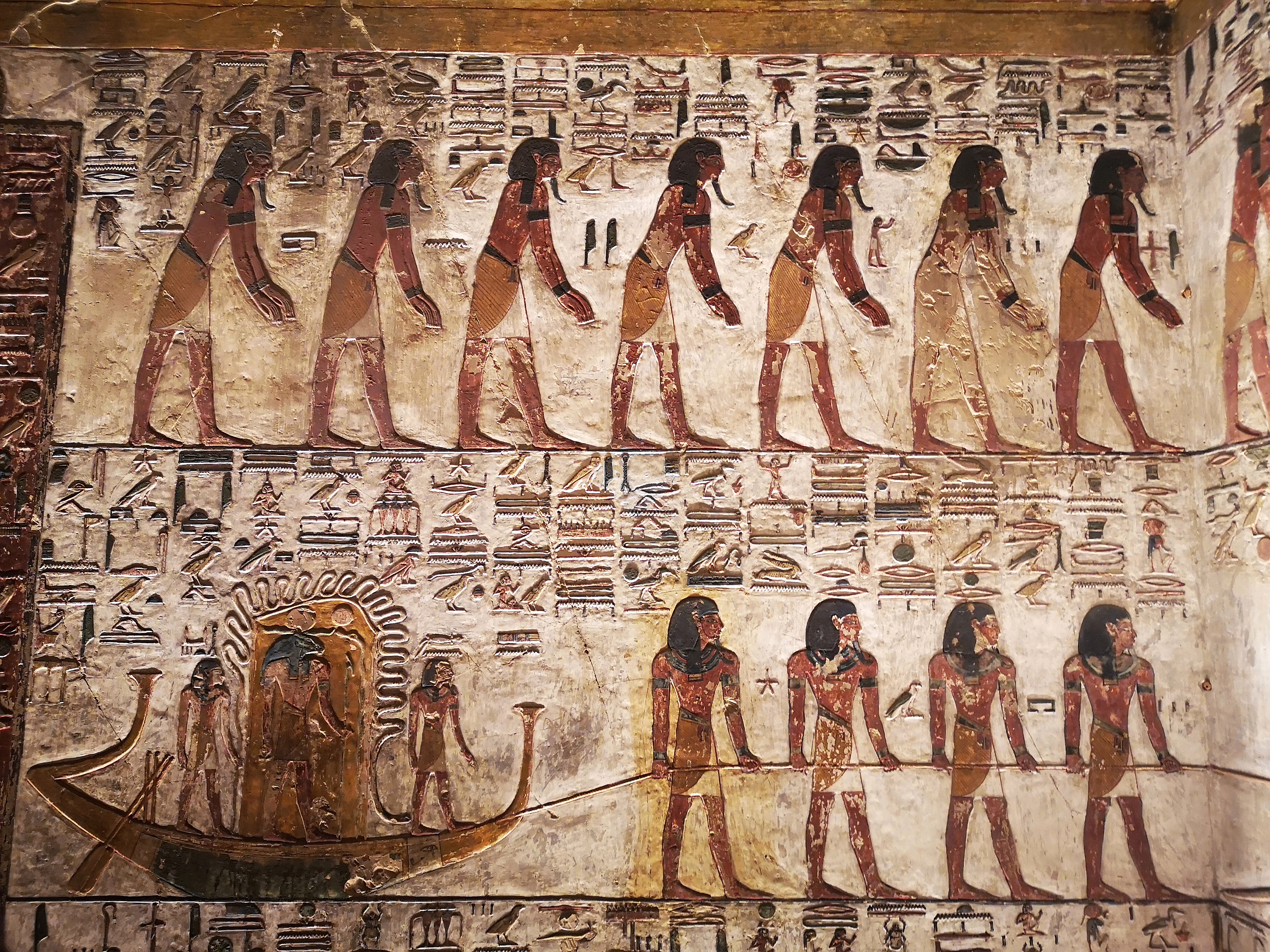
KV17, the tomb of Pharaoh Seti I of the Nineteenth Dynasty, Pillared chamber F, southeast wall decorated with the scenes from the Book of Gates, Valley of the Kings, Egypt

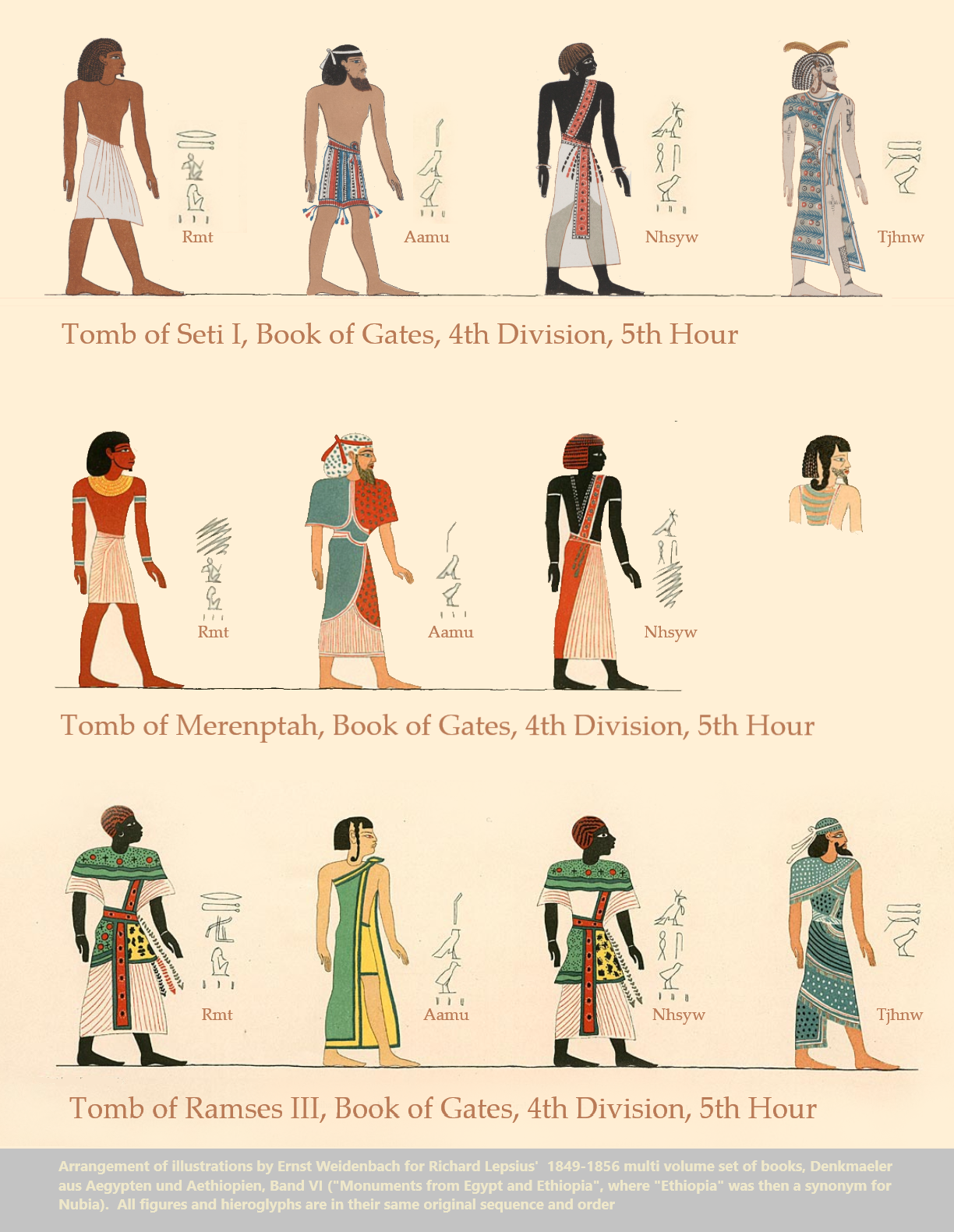
From three different tombs: Illustration of figures from the 4th Division of the 5th Hour in at 1) Tomb of Seti I 2) Tomb of Merenptah and 3)Tomb of Ramesses III

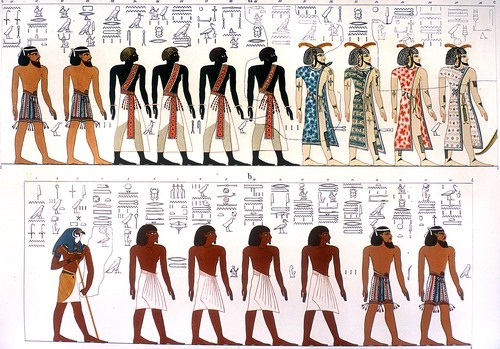
Illustration of The Fourth Division of the Fifth Hour at the Tomb of Seti I, full 4 sets of 4 figure types (as appears in tomb), starting bottom left, led by the god Horus

One of the most well known scenes in the Book of Gates is in its fourth division section of the Fifth Hour. Gods are depicted in the upper row. They also carry the body of a serpent. Hieroglyphs meaning "lifetime" can be seen in the lower register. At the beginning of the lower register are sixteen figures in repetitive sets of four being led by Horus into the afterworld. The four beings correspond to the four ethnicities people were categorized in: Egyptians (Remetu), Asiatics (Aamu), Nubians (Nehsey), Libyans (Themehu). These beings are represented because all people are welcome and must make the journey to the afterworld.

Nubians are depicted in consistent ways in all three tombs (although they are bare chested both at the tomb of Seti I and the tomb of Merenptah but not at Ramesses III) but in all three tombs the Nubian figures in this third position are consistently beardless, have jet black skin and have a thick red sash that goes across their chest and also wraps around the waist and dangles down. However, unlike in the tomb of Seti I and the tomb of Merenptah, at the tomb of Ramesses III, a second virtually the same figure is also found in the first position usually occupied by Egyptians. The hieroglyph usually representing Egyptians remains next to this figure in its traditional position. These two figures in the same garb at Ramesses III are similar in appearance to Nubians depicted in the Tomb of Huy and in other Egyptian art but similar figures are not found elsewhere in this tomb although a great number of other typically depicted Egyptian figures are.

Another peculiarity is that the Asiatic and Libyan are in consistent 2nd and 4th position at both Seti I and Merenptah tombs but switch position at the tomb of Ramesses III while the hieroglyphs do not. At Seti I and Merenptah tombs the Asiatic in the second position is depicted as is typical in much other art of the period, a bearded figure with a cloth headband with two excess pieces of the headband hanging down. Additionally at these two tombs, Seti and Merenptah, a Libyan is at the end of the row, at the 4th position and is depicted with typical Libyan features of the period, a side lock of hair and a long gown-like garment that is worn somewhat openly and with one or both shoulders exposed. However, while all the hieroglyphs in all three tombs remain in the same position left to right, at Ramesses III, these two figures Asiatic and Libyan, have switched position in comparison to the other tombs. The figures may have been created after a separate artisan had first rendered the hieroglyphs. The only figure at Ramesses III that is in the same position as the figures at Seti I and Merenptah tombs is the Nubian in the third position. The hieroglyph position have no irregularities in type or sequence between each tomb. The first figure at the Tomb of Ramesses III has a hieroglyph normally associated with Egyptians but may be placed next to the hieroglyph in error which sometimes occurs in tombs, however the explanation remains unresolved.

== Gallery ==
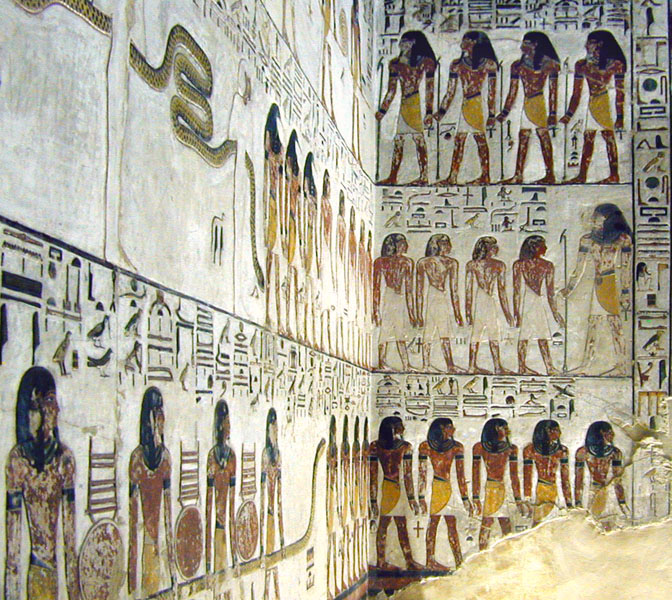
The Tomb of Seti I, Pillared chamber F Relief from KV17, the Tomb of Seti I Detail of the Book of Gates, 5th hour.

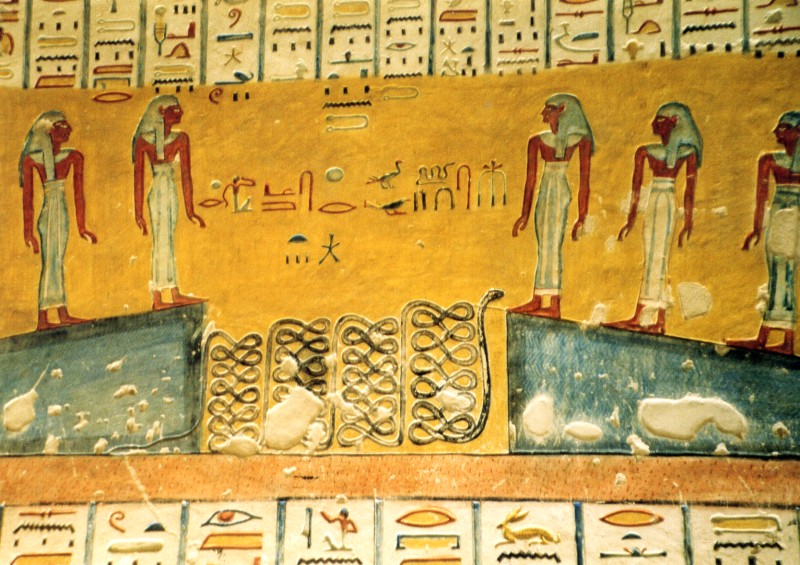
Fourth hour of the Book of the Gates from KV2, tomb of Rameses IV. Analysis: "the time is like a serpent, of which the nocturnal hours are born like goddesses. After its trip they are devoured again by the serpent. The blue triangles represent the water in the underworld".

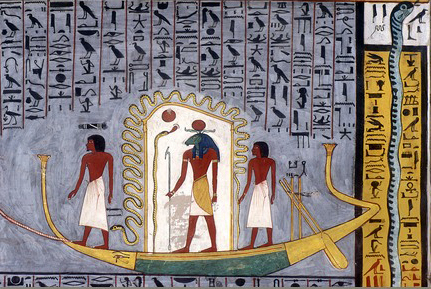
Ra traveling through the underworld in his barque, from the copy of the Book of Gates in the tomb of Ramses I (KV16).

illustration by Ernst Weidenbach for Richard Lepsius' 1849-1856 Denkmaeler aus Aegypten und Aethiopien depicting scenes form the Tomb of Seti I, esp. the Book of Gates "Table of Nations"

== See also ==
- Book of the Dead
- Gate deities of the underworld
- Teka-her
- Amduat
