= Harsiesis =

Harsiesis may refer to:

- Horus, the Egyptian god
- Harsiesis (genus), a genus of butterflies

== See also ==
- Harsiese (disambiguation)
