= Harsiese =

G5 H8 Z1 Q1 X1 H8
Harsiese
Ḥr-zꜣ-ꜣst
in hieroglyphs
Era: 3rd Intermediate Period
(1069–664 BC)

Harsiese (also Horsiese or Harsiesis, plus other variants) was an ancient Egyptian theophoric name, literally meaning "Horus, son of Isis". A related name is Siese. Some people by this name include:

- Harsiese A, an independent king in Upper Egypt during the Twenty-second Dynasty
- Harsiese B, a High Priest of Amun from the end of Osorkon II's reign to Year 19 of Pedubast I
- Harsiese (C), a Second Prophet of Amun
- Harsiese (High Priest of Ptah), served as High Priest of Ptah during the reign of Psusennes I
- Harsiesi, native rebel against Ptolemy VIII Physcon

== See also ==
- Harsiesis (disambiguation)
