= Hieracosphinx =

Egyptian mythical beast

hieracosphinx

Creature information
- Grouping: Legendary creatures
- Similar entities: Sphinx

Origin
- Region: Ancient Egypt

The hieracosphinx (Ancient Greek: ἱερακόσφιγξ) is a mythical beast found in Egyptian sculpture and European heraldry. The god Haroeris ("Horus the Elder") was usually depicted as one. The name Hieracosphinx comes from the Greek Ιερακόσφιγξ, itself from ἱέραξ (hierax "hawk") + σφίγξ ("sphinx").

== Description ==
The Hieracosphinx has the head of a hawk and the body of a lion. The name was coined by Herodotus for the hawk-headed sphinxes that he saw in Egypt; the other being the ram-headed sphinx which Herodotus called Criosphinx (Ancient Greek: Κριόσφιγξ).

== In popular culture ==
The Hieracosphinx is the name of a monster card in the Yu-Gi-Oh! Trading Card Game Trading Card Game.

In the Real-time strategy game Age of Mythology, worshipping Bast allows players to upgrade their Sphinxes to Hieracosphinxes.

== See also ==
- Ammit – Ancient Egyptian goddess
- Griffin – Legendary animal
- Hippogriff – Legendary creature
- Sphinx – Mythological creature with a human head and lion body
- Serpopard – Mythical animal known from ancient Egyptian and Mesopotamian art
