= Horus =

Egyptian war and sky deity

- Horus was often the ancient Egyptians' national tutelary deity. He was usually depicted as a falcon-headed man wearing the pschent, also known as a red and white crown, as a symbol of kingship over the entire kingdom of Egypt.
Name in hieroglyphs
G5
- Major cult center: Nekhen, Edfu
- Symbol: Eye of Horus
- Enemy: Set

Genealogy
- Parents: Osiris and Isis, Osiris and Nephthys Hathor
- Siblings: Anubis, (Note: In some accounts.) Bastet (Note: Rarely attested.)
- Consort: Hathor, Isis, Serket, Nephthys, Ta-Bitjet
- Offspring: Imsety, Hapy, Duamutef, Qebehsenuef, Ihy, Thoth (In some less common variants)

Equivalents
- Greek: Apollo
- Nubian: Mandulis

Horus (/hɔːrəs/), (Note: Ancient Greek: Ὧρος, romanized: Hō̂ros, Ancient Greek pronunciation: [hɔ̂ː.ros]; Latin: Hōrus, Latin pronunciation: [hoː.rus]) also known as Heru, Har, Her, or Hor (/hɔːr/) (Note: Ancient Egyptian: ḥr; Coptic: Ϩⲱⲣ, romanized: Hōr, Coptic pronunciation: [hɔr]) in Ancient Egyptian, is one of the most significant ancient Egyptian deities. He is known as the Ancient Egyptian god of kingship, healing, protection, the sun, and the sky. He was worshipped from at least the late prehistoric Egypt until the Ptolemaic Kingdom and Roman Egypt. Different descriptions of Horus are recorded in history, and these are treated as distinct gods by Egyptologists. These various forms may be different manifestations of the same multi-layered deity in which certain attributes or syncretic relationships are emphasized, not necessarily in opposition but complementary to one another, consistent with how the Ancient Egyptians viewed the multiple facets of reality. He was most often depicted as a falcon, most likely a lanner falcon or peregrine falcon, or as a man with a falcon head.

The earliest recorded form of Horus is the tutelary deity of Nekhen in Upper Egypt, who is the first known national god, specifically related to the ruling pharaoh who in time came to be regarded as a manifestation of Horus in life and Osiris in death. The most commonly encountered family relationship describes Horus as the son of Isis and Osiris, and he plays a key role in the Osiris myth as Osiris's heir and the rival to Set, the murderer and brother of Osiris. In another tradition, Hathor is regarded as his mother and sometimes as his wife.

Practicing interpretatio romana, Claudius Aelianus wrote that Egyptians called the god Apollo "Horus" in their own language. However, Plutarch, elaborating further on the same tradition reported by the Greeks, specified that the one "Horus" whom the Egyptians equated with the Greek Apollo was in fact "Horus the Elder", a primordial form of Horus whom Plutarch distinguishes from both Horus and Harpocrates.

== Etymology ==
Horus is recorded in Egyptian hieroglyphs as ḥr.w "Falcon", 𓅃; the original pronunciation has been reconstructed as /ˈħaːɾuw/ in Old Egyptian and early Middle Egyptian, /ˈħaːɾəʔ/ in later Middle Egyptian, and /ˈħoːɾ(ə)/ in Late Egyptian. Additional meanings are thought to have been "the distant one" or "one who is above, over". As the language changed over time, it appeared in Coptic varieties variously as /hɔr/ or /ħoːɾ/ (Ϩⲱⲣ) and was adopted into ancient Greek as Ὧρος Hō̂ros (pronounced at the time as /hɔ̂ːros/). It also survives in Late Egyptian and Coptic theophoric name forms such as Siese "son of Isis" and Harsiese "Horus, Son of Isis".

Horakhti or Hor-Akhti, "Horus of the Two Horizons", was the personification of the Sun on the horizon according to Egyptian mythology.

== Horus and the pharaoh ==
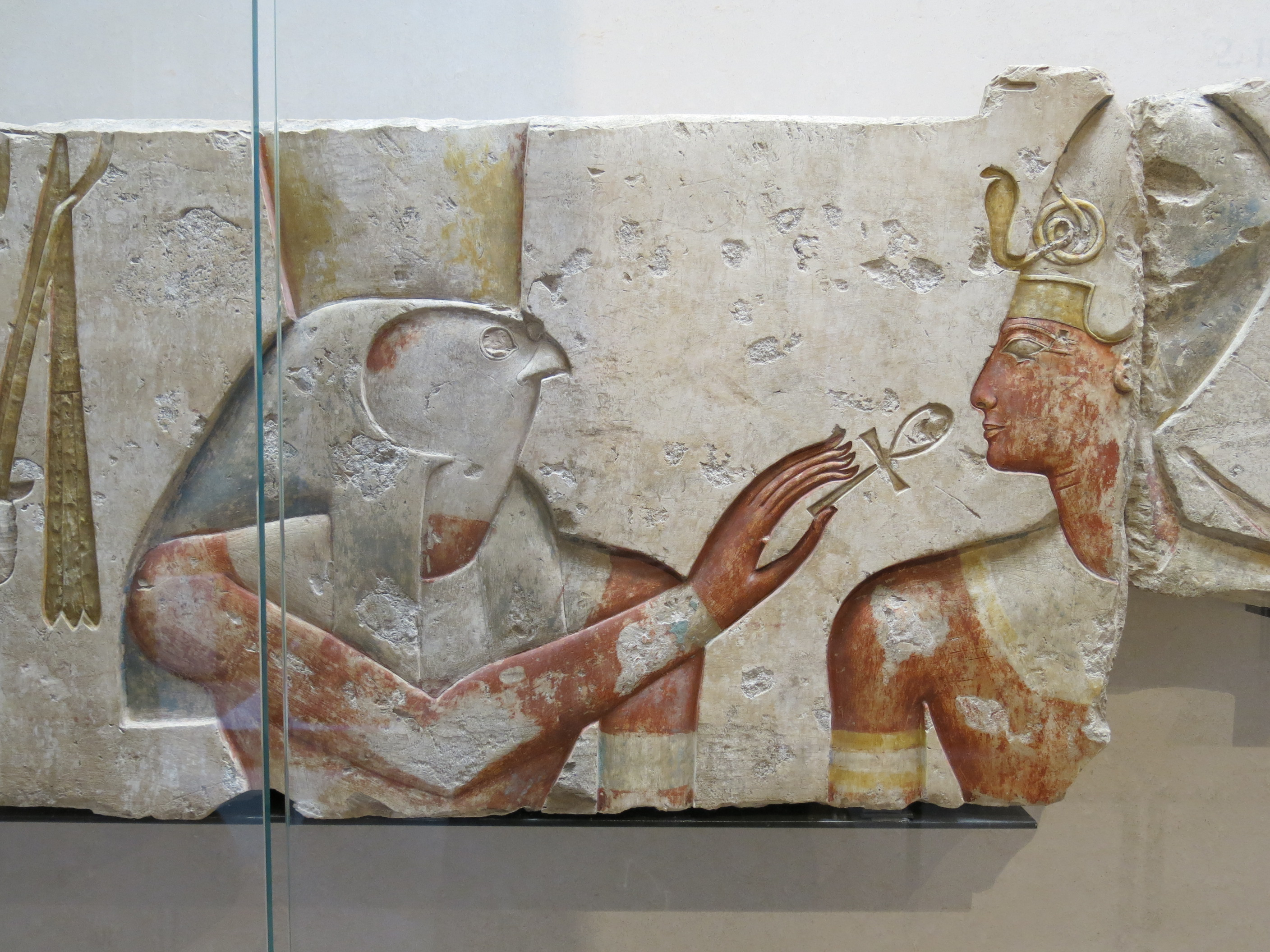
Horus offers life (symbolized by an Ankh) to the pharaoh, Ramesses II. Painted limestone. c. 1275 BCE, 19th dynasty. From the small temple built by Ramses II in Abydos, Louvre museum, Paris, France.

The pharaoh was associated with many specific deities. He was identified directly with Horus, who represented kingship itself and was seen as a protector of the pharaoh, and he was seen as the son of Ra, who ruled and regulated nature as the pharaoh ruled and regulated society.

The Pyramid Texts (c. 2400–2300 BCE) describe the nature of the pharaoh in different characters as both Horus and Osiris. The pharaoh as Horus in life became the pharaoh as Osiris in death, where he was united with the other gods. New incarnations of Horus succeeded the deceased pharaoh on earth in the form of new pharaohs.

The lineage of Horus, the eventual product of unions between the children of Atum, may have been a means to explain and justify pharaonic power. The gods produced by Atum were all representative of cosmic and terrestrial forces in Egyptian life. By identifying Horus as the offspring of these forces, then identifying him with Atum himself, and finally identifying the Pharaoh with Horus, the Pharaoh theologically had dominion over all the world.

== Origin mythology ==
In one tale, Horus was born after his mother Isis retrieved all the dismembered body parts of her murdered husband Osiris, except his penis, which was thrown into the Nile and eaten by a catfish/Medjed or, in some tellings, by a crab. Older Egyptian accounts have the penis of Osiris surviving. According to Plutarch's account, Isis used her magic powers to resurrect Osiris and fashion a phallus to conceive her son. After becoming pregnant, Isis fled to the Nile Delta marshlands to hide from her brother Set, who had jealously killed Osiris and who she knew would want to kill their son. There Isis bore a divine son, Horus.

As birth, death and rebirth are recurrent themes in Egyptian lore and cosmology, it is not particularly strange that another form of Horus is the brother of Osiris and Isis by Nut and Geb, together with Nephthys and Set. This elder Horus is called Heru-ur (also Hrw-wr or Hourou'Ur) in contrast to the younger Horus, Heru-pa-khered (also Hrw-P-Khrd), later adopted by the Greeks as Harpocrates.

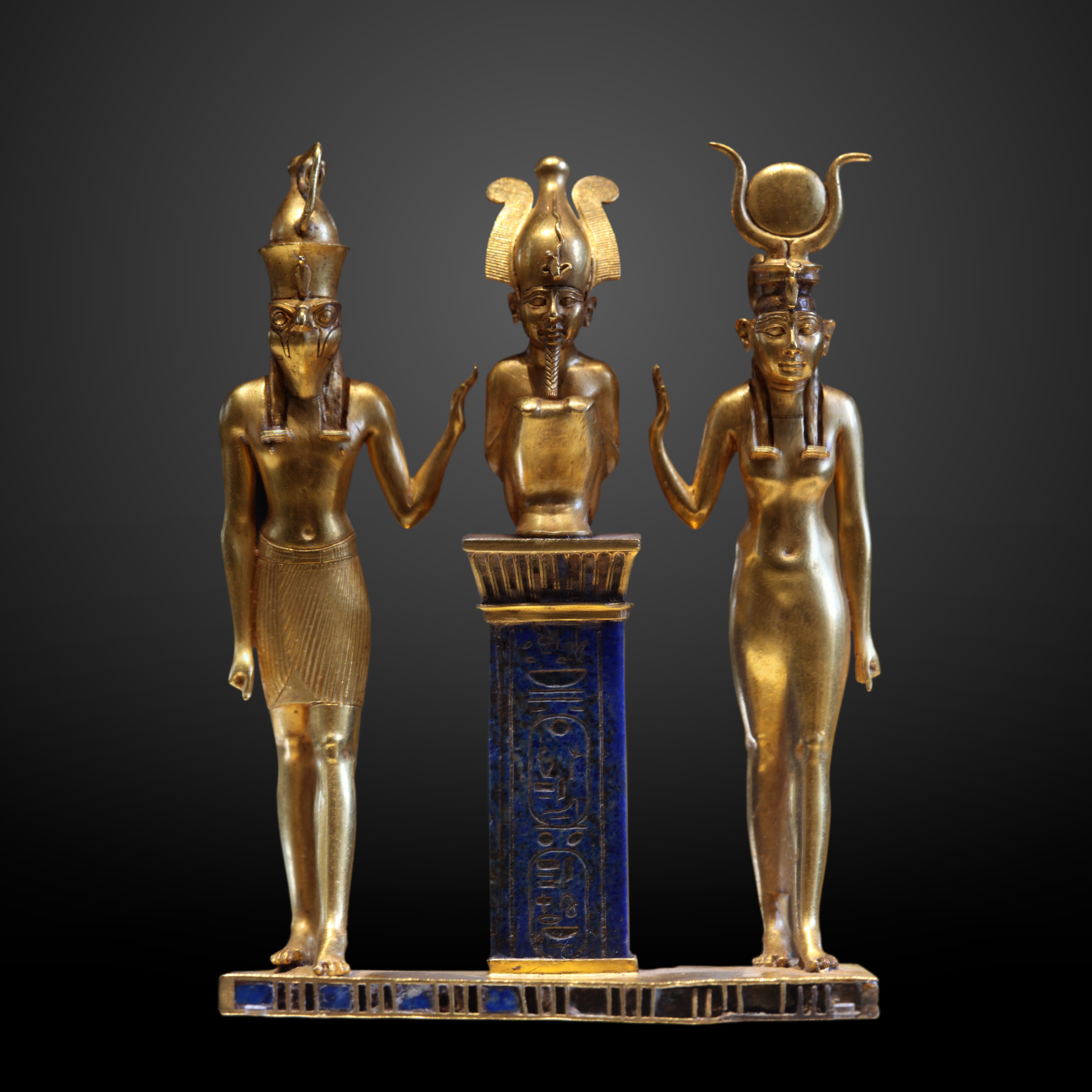
Osiris is depicted on a lapis lazuli pillar in the center, flanked by Horus on the left and Isis on the right, in this Twenty-Second Dynasty statuette of Pharaoh Osorkon II.

=== Genealogy ===
Atum or Ra
Shu	Tefnut
Geb	Nut
Osiris	Isis	Horus (The Elder)	Set	Nephthys
Horus (The Younger)	Hathor

== Mythological roles ==
G9 N27 N27
rˁ-ḥr-3ḫty "Ra-Horakhty"
in hieroglyphs

=== Sky god ===
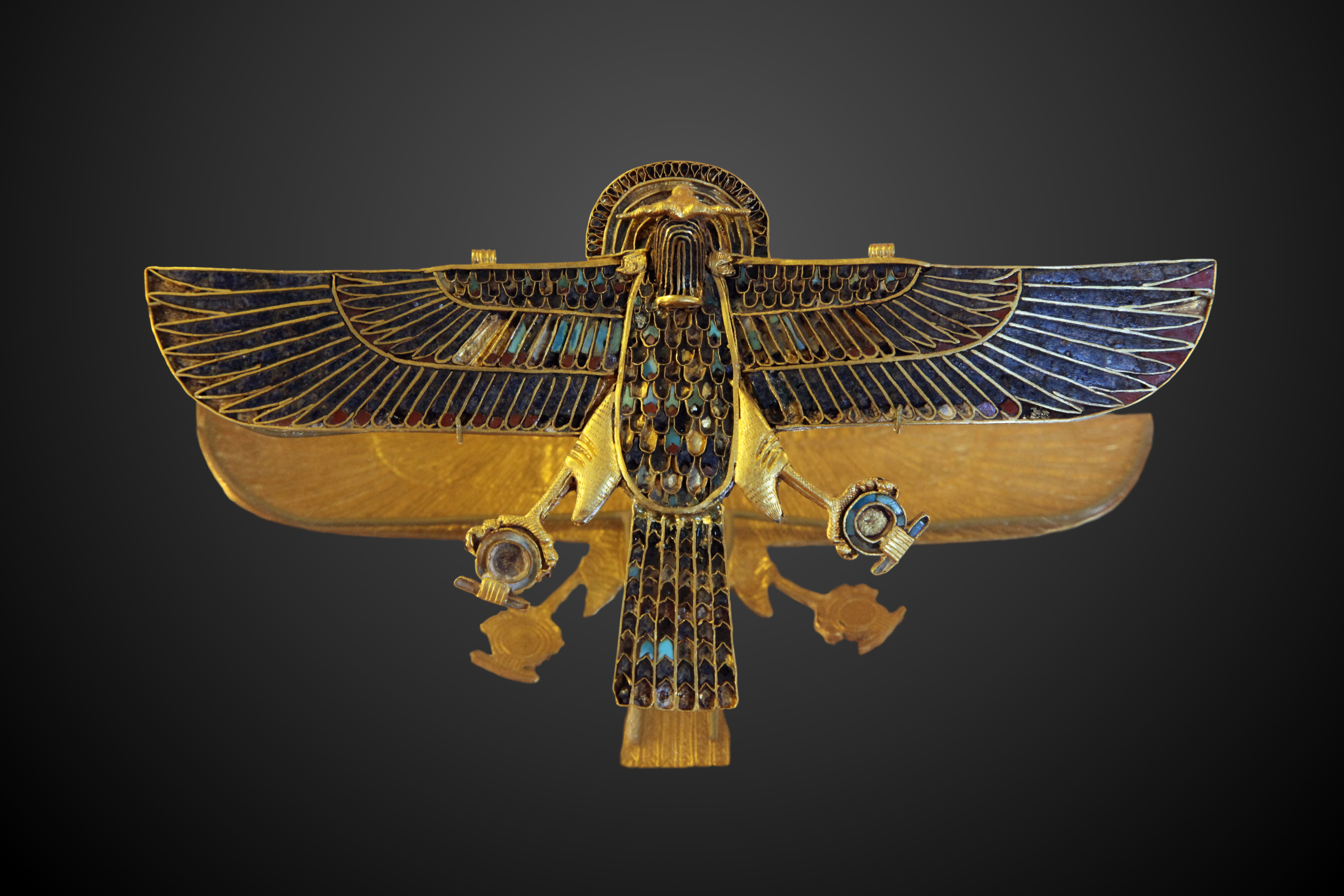
Horus, Louvre, Shen rings in his grasp

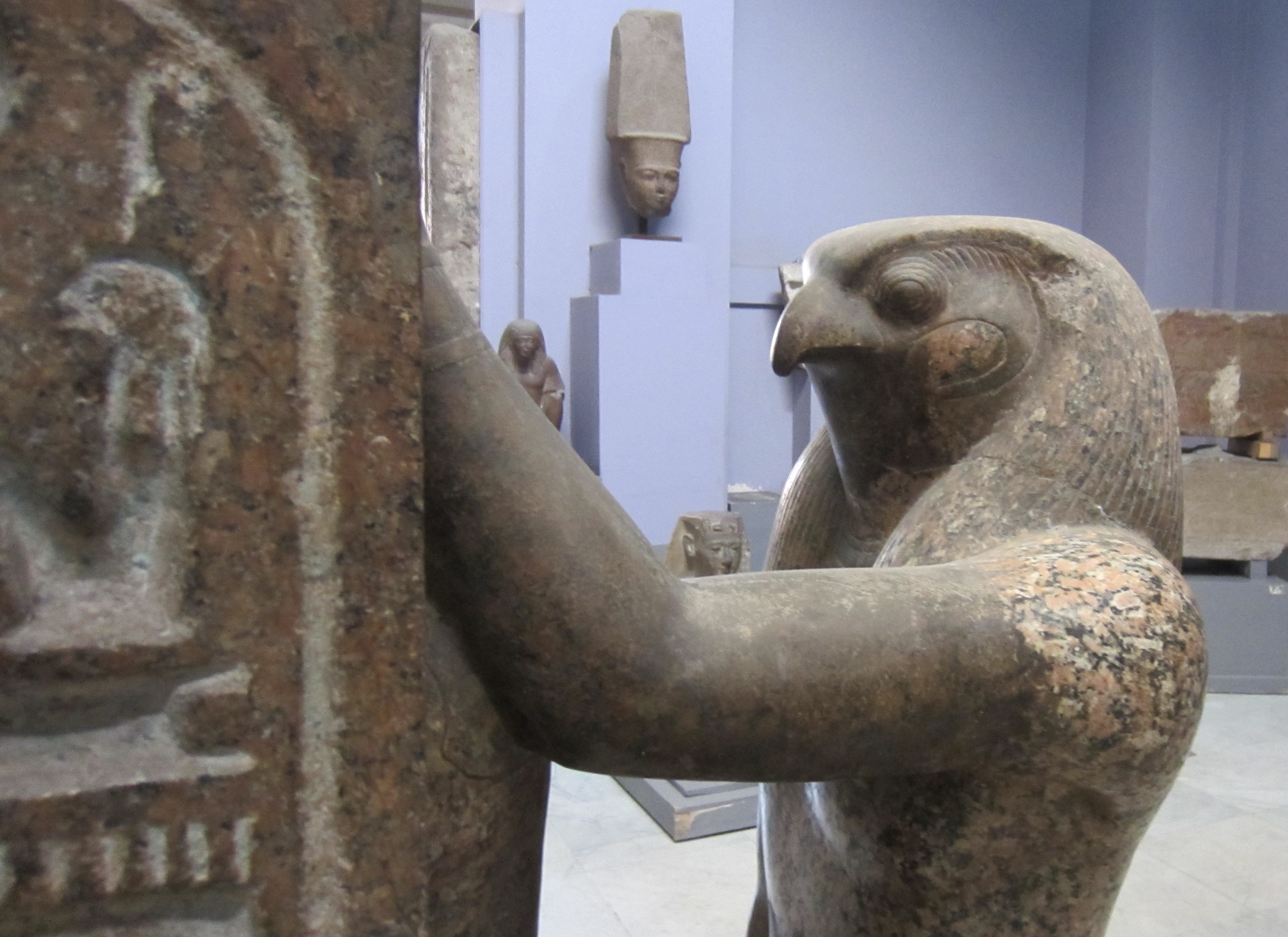
Detail of Horus's face, from a statue of Horus and Set placing the crown of Upper Egypt on the head of Ramesses III. Twentieth Dynasty, early 12th century BC.

Since Horus was said to be the sky, he was considered to also contain the Sun and Moon. Egyptians believed that the Sun was his right eye and the Moon his left and that they traversed the sky when he, a falcon, flew across it. Later, the reason that the Moon was not as bright as the sun was explained by a tale, known as The Contendings of Horus and Seth. In this tale, it was said that Seth, the patron of Upper Egypt, and Horus, the patron of Lower Egypt, had battled for Egypt brutally, with neither side victorious, until eventually, the gods sided with Horus.

As Horus was the ultimate victor he became known as ḥr.w or "Horus the Great", but more usually translated as "Horus the Elder". In the struggle, Set had lost a testicle, and Horus's eye was gouged out.

Horus was occasionally shown in art as a naked boy with a finger in his mouth sitting on a lotus with his mother. In the form of a youth, Horus was referred to as nfr ḥr.w "Good Horus", transliterated Neferhor, Nephoros or Nopheros (reconstructed as naːfiru ħaːruw).

Eye of Horus or Wedjat

The Eye of Horus is an ancient Egyptian symbol of protection and royal power from deities, in this case from Horus or Ra. The symbol is seen on images of Horus's mother, Isis, and on other deities associated with her. In the Egyptian language, the word for this symbol was "wedjat" (wɟt). It was the eye of one of the earliest Egyptian deities, Wadjet, who later became associated with Bastet, Mut, and Hathor as well. Wadjet was a solar deity and this symbol began as her all-seeing eye. In early artwork, Hathor is also depicted with this eye. Funerary amulets were often made in the shape of the Eye of Horus. The Wedjat or Eye of Horus is "the central element" of seven "gold, faience, carnelian and lapis lazuli" bracelets found on the mummy of Shoshenq II. The Wedjat "was intended to protect the king [here] in the afterlife" and to ward off evil. Egyptian and Near Eastern sailors would frequently paint the symbol on the bow of their vessel to ensure safe sea travel.

Horus was also thought to protect the sky.

=== Conflict between Horus and Set ===
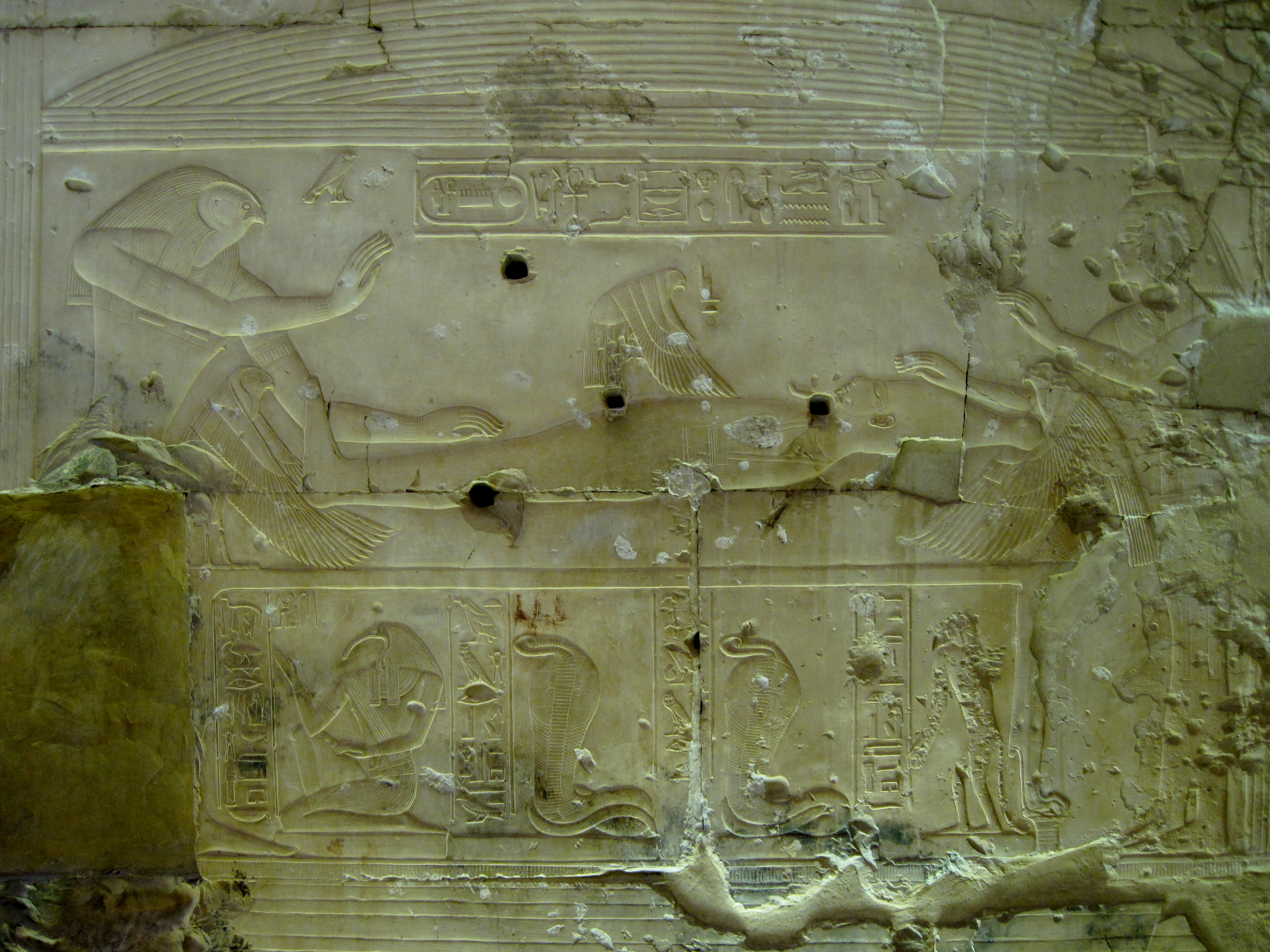
Isis, in the form of a bird, copulates with the deceased Osiris. At either side are Horus, although he is as yet unborn, and Isis in human form.

Horus was told by his mother, Isis, to protect the people of Egypt from Set, the god of the desert, who had killed Horus's father, Osiris. Horus had many battles with Set, not only to avenge his father but to choose the rightful ruler of Egypt. In these battles, Horus came to be associated with Lower Egypt and became its patron.

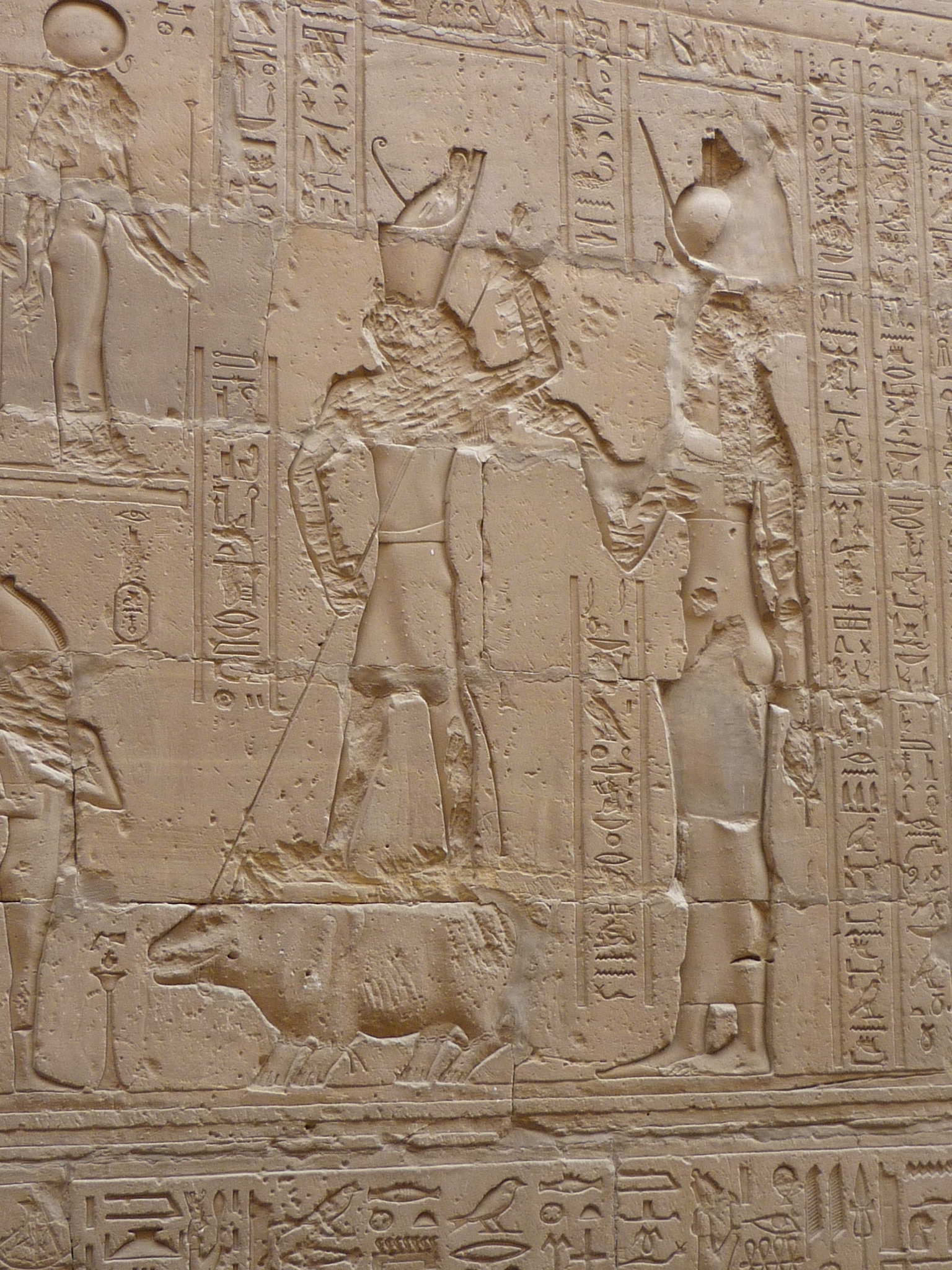
Horus spears Set, who appears in the form of a hippopotamus, as Isis looks on

According to The Contendings of Horus and Seth, Set is depicted as trying to prove his dominance by seducing Horus and then having sexual intercourse with him. However, Horus places his hand between his thighs and catches Set's semen, then subsequently throws it in the river so that he may not be said to have been inseminated by Set. Horus (or Isis herself in some versions) then deliberately spreads his semen on some lettuce, which was Set's favourite food. After Set had eaten the lettuce, they went to the gods to try to settle the argument over the rule of Egypt. The gods first listened to Set's claim of dominance over Horus, and call his semen forth, but it answered from the river, invalidating his claim. Then, the gods listened to Horus's claim of having dominated Set, and call his semen forth, and it answered from inside Set. However, Set still refused to relent, and the other gods were getting tired from over eighty years of fighting and challenges. Horus and Set challenged each other to a boat race, where they each raced in a boat made of stone. Horus and Set agreed, and the race started. But Horus had an edge: his boat was made of wood painted to resemble stone, rather than true stone. Set's boat, being made of heavy stone, sank, but Horus's did not. Horus then won the race, and Set stepped down and officially gave Horus the throne of Egypt. Upon becoming king after Set's defeat, Horus gives offerings to his deceased father Osiris, thus reviving and sustaining him in the afterlife. After the New Kingdom, Set was still considered the lord of the desert and its oases. In many versions of the story, Horus and Set divide the realm between them. This division can be equated with any of several fundamental dualities that the Egyptians saw in their world. Horus may receive the fertile lands around the Nile, the core of Egyptian civilization, in which case Set takes the barren desert or the foreign lands that are associated with it; Horus may rule the earth while Set dwells in the sky; and each god may take one of the two traditional halves of the country, Upper and Lower Egypt, in which case either god may be connected with either region. Yet in the Memphite Theology, Geb, as judge, first apportions the realm between the claimants and then reverses himself, awarding sole control to Horus. In this peaceable union, Horus and Set are reconciled, and the dualities that they represent have been resolved into a united whole. Through this resolution, the order is restored after the tumultuous conflict.Egyptologists have often tried to connect the conflict between the two gods with political events early in Egypt's history or prehistory. The cases in which the combatants divide the kingdom, and the frequent association of the paired Horus and Set with the union of Upper and Lower Egypt, suggest that the two deities represent some kind of division within the country. Egyptian tradition and archaeological evidence indicate that Egypt was united at the beginning of its history when an Upper Egyptian kingdom, in the south, conquered Lower Egypt in the north. The Upper Egyptian rulers called themselves "followers of Horus", and Horus became the tutelary deity of the unified polity and its kings. Yet Horus and Set cannot be easily equated with the two halves of the country. Both deities had several cult centers in each region, and Horus is often associated with Lower Egypt and Set with Upper Egypt. Other events may have also affected the myth. Before even Upper Egypt had a single ruler, two of its major cities were Nekhen, in the far south, and Nagada, many miles to the north. The rulers of Nekhen, where Horus was the patron deity, are generally believed to have unified Upper Egypt, including Nagada, under their sway. Set was associated with Nagada, so it is possible that the divine conflict dimly reflects an enmity between the cities in the distant past. Much later, at the end of the Second Dynasty (c. 2890–2686 BCE), Pharaoh Seth-Peribsen used the Set animal to write his serekh name in place of the falcon hieroglyph representing Horus. His successor Khasekhemwy used both Horus and Set in the writing of his serekh after reuniting Ehypt. This evidence has prompted conjecture that the Second Dynasty saw a clash between the followers of Horus led by Khasekhem (Khasekhemwy's name pre-reunification) and the worshippers of Set led by Seth-Peribsen. Khasekhemwy's use of the two animal symbols would then represent the reconciliation of the two factions, as does the resolution of the myth.

=== Golden Horus Osiris ===
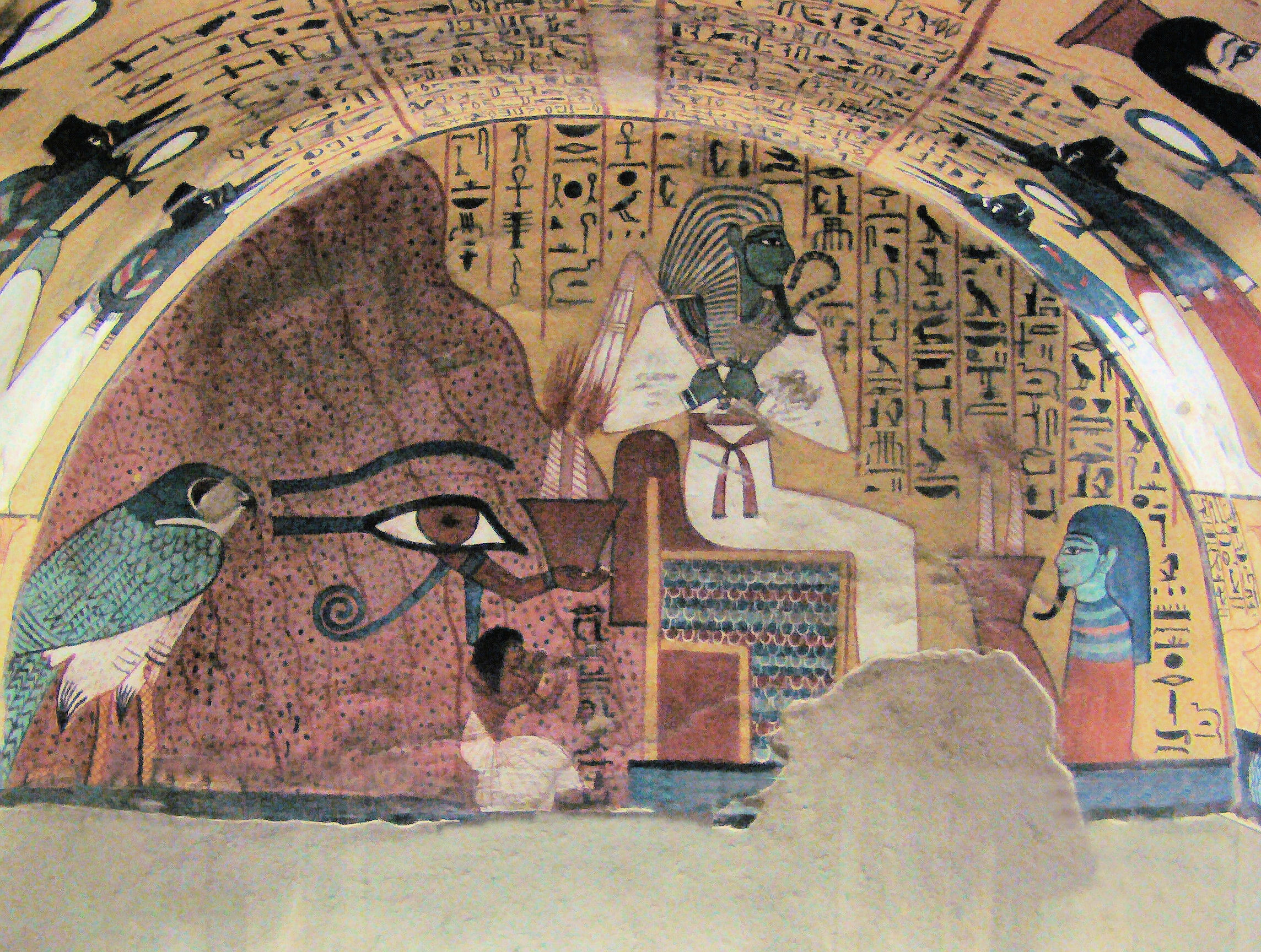
A personified Eye of Horus offers incense to the enthroned god Osiris in a painting from the tomb of Pashedu, thirteenth century BC

Horus gradually took on the nature as both the son of Osiris and Osiris himself. He was referred to as Golden Horus Osiris. In the temple of Denderah he is given the full royal titulary of both that of Horus and Osiris. He was sometimes believed to be both the father of himself as well as his own son, and some later accounts have Osiris being brought back to life by Isis.

== Forms of Horus ==
Horus represented as a falcon-headed man, with the white crown on top of the red crown

Horus with the red crown on top of the white crown

Ra-Horakhty, a form of Ra syncretized with Horus

Horus and Set depicted as one

Her-sema-tawy; Horus tying upper and lower Egypt together with Set

Horus and Set crowning the pharaoh.

Heru-pa-khered, a form of Horus represented as a child

Iunmutef, a fully humanoid form of Horus represented as a priest wearing a leopard skin,

Hor-iunmutef, a form of Iunmutef syncretized with Horus

Horus as a falcon

Horus represented as a crowned falcon

Har-em-akhet or Heru-ur, two forms of Horus in which he had the body of a lion

Hor-imy-shenut, a form of Horus in which he had the body of a crocodile

Heru-Behdeti, a form of Horus represented as a winged sun

=== Heru-ur (Horus the Elder) ===
Heru-ur
Name in hieroglyphs
G5 wr r
- Major cult center: Heliopolis, Giza
- Symbol: falcon, falcon-headed man, Hieracosphinx

Genealogy
- Parents: Geb and Nut, or Ra and Heqet (in Kom Ombo)
- Siblings: Osiris, Isis, Set, and Nephthys, or Tasenetnofret (in Kom Ombo)
- Consort: Serket, Hathor, Tasenetnofret (in Kom Ombo)
- Offspring: the Four sons of Horus (Imsety, Hapy, Duamutef, and Qebehsenuef) or Panebtawy (in Kom Ombo)

Heru-ur, also known as Heru-wer, Semsu, Shemsu, Semsem,Haroeris, Horus the Great, or Horus the Elder was the mature representation of the god Horus. This manifestation of Horus was especially worshipped at Letopolis in Lower Egypt. The Greeks identified him with the Greek god Apollo.

His titles include: 'foremost of the two eyes', 'great god', 'lord of Ombos', 'possessor of the ijt-knife, who resides in Letopolis', 'Shu, son of Ra', 'Horus, strong of arm', 'great of power' and 'lord of the slaughter in the entire land'. 'Foremost of the two eyes' was a common epithet which was referring to the two eyes of the sky god. The two eyes represent the sun and the moon, as well as the Wadjet-eye, and played an important role in the cult of Heru-ur. His cult center was originally Letopolis; later he was also worshipped in Kom Ombo and Qus. In Kom Ombo, he was worshipped as the son of Ra and Heqet, the husband of his sister-wife Tasenetnofret and father of the child god Panebtawy.

In his Moralia, the Greek philosopher Plutarch mentions three additional parentage traditions that supposedly existed for Heru-ur during the Ptolemaic period. According to Plutarch's account, Heru-ur was believed to be the son of Geb and Nut, born on the second of the five intercalary days at the end of the year, after Osiris and before Set, Isis, and Nephthys. Plutarch also records a variant tradition that assigns different fathers to Nut's children: Osiris and Heru-ur are attributed to Nut and Ra, Isis to Nut and Thoth, while Nephthys and Set are said to be the children of Nut and Geb. Additionally, similar to other manifestations of Horus, Heru-ur is sometimes regarded as the child of Isis and Osiris, conceived by the pair while still within the womb of Nut.

Plutarch aims to distinguish between the child form of Horus, the son of Osiris and Isis, and 'Haroëris' whom he refers to as 'the elder Horus'. Haroëris is the hellenized version of the Egyptian epithet 'Horus-wer', which directly translates to 'Horus the Great,' a term first appearing in Papyrus Spell 588, likely to differentiate Horus of the royal cult from lesser forms of Horus. However, ancient Egyptian texts do not maintain a distinction between a Horus the Elder and a 'younger' Horus. Horus-wer is also sometimes referred to as the son of Osiris and Isis, and 'wer' is a common epithet for ancient Egyptian gods and does not imply a separation between older and younger deities into two different generations.

Heru-ur was sometimes depicted fully as a falcon; he was sometimes given the title Kemwer, meaning "(the) great black (one)". Heru-ur was also depicted as a Hieracosphinx (a falcon headed lion).

Other variants include Hor Merti 'Horus of the two eyes' and Horkhenti Irti.

=== Heru-pa-khered (Horus the child) ===
Heru-pa-khered (Harpocrates to the Ptolemaic Greeks), also known as Horus the child, is represented in the form of a youth wearing a lock of hair (a sign of youth) on the right of his head while sucking his finger. In addition, he usually wears the united crowns of Egypt, the crown of Upper Egypt and the crown of Lower Egypt. He is a form of the rising sun, representing its earliest light.

As early as the third millennium BCE, Ancient Egyptian texts such as the Pyramid Texts referenced the birth, youth, and adulthood of the god Horus. However, his image as a child deity was not firmly established until the first millennium BCE, when Egyptian theologians began associating child gods with adult gods. From a historical perspective, Harpocrates is an artificial creation, originating from the priesthood of Thebes and later gaining popularity in the cults of other cities. His first known depiction dates to a stele from Mendes, erected during the reign of Sheshonq III (22nd Libyan Dynasty), commemorating a donation by the flutist Ânkhhorpakhered. Initially, Harpocrates originated as a duplicate of Khonsu-pa-khered, providing a child-god figure for the funerary gods Osiris and Isis. Unlike Horus, who was traditionally depicted as an adult, Khonsu, the lunar god, was inherently associated with youth. The cults of Harpocrates and Khonsu originally merged in a sanctuary within the Mut enclosure at Karnak. This sanctuary, later transformed into a mammisi (birth house) under the 21st Dynasty, celebrated the divine birth of the pharaoh, connecting the queen mother with the mother-goddesses Mut and Isis. The merging of local Theban beliefs with the Osiris cult endowed Harpocrates with dual ancestry, as seen in inscriptions at Wadi Hammamat which name him 'Horus-the-child, son of Osiris and Isis, the Elder, the first-born of Amun.' The Osirian tradition solidified Harpocrates as the archetype of child-gods, firmly integrated into the Osirian family.

=== Heru-Behdeti (Horus of Behdet) ===
Heru-Behdeti
Name in hieroglyphs
G5 bH d t y
- Major cult center: Edfu
- Symbol: winged sun
- Consort: Hathor
- Offspring: Harsomtus

The winged sun of Horus of Edfu is a symbol in associated with divinity, royalty, and power in ancient Egypt. The winged sun was depicted on the top of pylons in the ancient temples throughout Egypt.

=== Har-em-akhet (Horus in the Horizon) ===
Har-em-akhet, alternatively spelled as Horemakhet and Horakhty (Harmakhis in Greek), represented the dawn and the early morning sun. He was often depicted as a sphinx with the head of a man (like the Great Sphinx of Giza), or as a hieracosphinx, a creature with a lion's body and a falcon's head and wings, sometimes with the head of a lion or ram (the latter providing a link to the god Khepri, the rising sun). It was believed that he was the inspiration for the Great Sphinx of Giza, constructed under the order of Khafre, whose head it depicts.

=== Harpara (Horus the sun) ===
Harpara ("Horus the sun") is the child of Montu and Raet-Tawy, and formed with them the divine triad of North Karnak and Armant. In Medamud, Harpara was worshipped as the firstborn son of Amun and Raet-Tawy. while he is elsewhere described as the son of Mehet-Weret. A local form of Thoth named Thoth-of-Armant was most likely worshipped as the adult form of Harpara. In his capacity as the young manifestation of Thoth, Harpara was considered a lunar deity at Armant.

=== Other forms of Horus ===
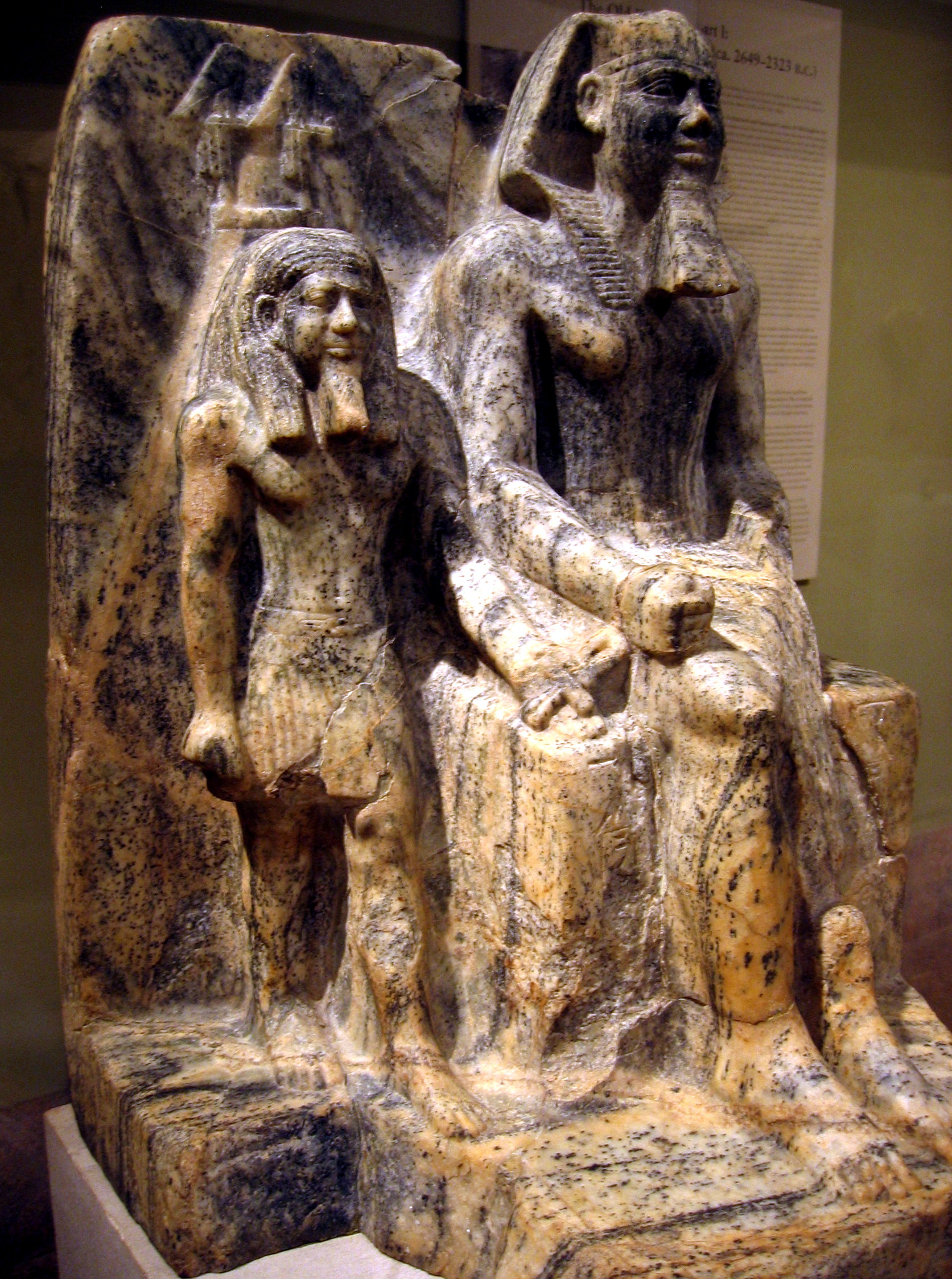
Herui, the 5th nome of Upper Egypt god in Coptos besides the pharaoh Sahure.

- Hor Merti (Horus of the Two Eyes)
- Har-Nedj-Hef (Horus, the protector of his father) – A form of Horus who protected Osiris
- Horkhenti Irti
- Hor-imy-shenut – A form of Horus who had the body of a Crocodile
- Her-sema-tawy (Horus, Uniter of the Two Lands) – the Greek Harsomptus, depicted like the double-crowned Horus
- Her-iunmutef (Horus, Pillar of His Mother) – A form of Horus depicted as a priest with a leopard-skin over the torso.
- Herui (double falcon or Horuses) – the 5th nome of Upper Egypt god in Coptos.

== Celebrations of Horus ==
The Festival of Victory (Egyptian: Heb Nekhtet) was an annual Egyptian festival dedicated to the god Horus. The Festival of Victory was celebrated at the Temple of Horus at Edfu, and took place during the second month of the Season of the Emergence (or the sixth month of the Egyptian calendar).

The ceremonies which took place during the Festival of Victory included the performance of a sacred drama which commemorated the victory of Horus over Set. The main actor in this drama was the king of Egypt himself, who played the role of Horus. His adversary was a hippopotamus, who played the role of Set. In the course of the ritual, the king would strike the hippopotamus with a harpoon. The destruction of the hippopotamus by the king commemorated the defeat of Set by Horus, which also legitimised the king.

It is unlikely that the king attended the Festival of Victory every year; in many cases he was probably represented by a priest. It is also unlikely that a real hippopotamus was used in the festival every year; in many cases it was probably represented by a model.

The 4th-century Roman author Macrobius mentions another annual Egyptian festival dedicated to Horus in his Chronicon. Macrobius specifies this festival as occurring on the winter solstice. The 4th-century Christian bishop Epiphanius of Salamis also mentions a winter solstice festival of Horus in his Panarion. However, this festival is not attested in any native Egyptian sources.

== Suggested influence on Christianity ==
William R. Cooper's 1877 book and Acharya S's self-published 2008 book, among others, have suggested that there are many similarities between the story of Horus and the much later story of Jesus. This outlook remains very controversial and is disputed by scholars.

== In popular culture ==
Declan Hannigan portrays Horus in the Marvel Cinematic Universe (MCU) television series Moon Knight (2022).

In the film series Night at the Museum, a group of underworld warrior deities appear in Night at the Museum: Battle of the Smithsonian when Kahmunrah uses the combination to open the gate to the underworld and summon an army of Horus warriors. The warriors appear from the underworld carrying spears ready to attack and join Kahmunrah's fight to take over the world.

Horus is a Warrior-class God in the multiplayer online battle arena game Smite with the title of "The Rightful Heir".

In the book trilogy The Kane Chronicles by Rick Riordan, main character Carter Kane hosts the spirit of Horus when he is released in the British Museum along with four other Egyptian deities. Horus speaks to Carter throughout the trilogy, offering him his advice and wisdom.

In the fantasy action film Gods of Egypt Horus is portrayed by Nikolaj Coster-Waldau. In the film, he helps out a mortal named Bek to stop his uncle Set while also trying to reclaim his throne and bring peace to Egypt.

Horus appears in a 1980 science fiction graphic novel La Foire aux immortels written and illustrated by French cartoonist and storyteller Enki Bilal.

Horus appears as a god that can be prayed to in 2023's Total War: Pharaoh. Praying to Horus increases the movement speed of the player's armies and makes them immune to attrition.

== Gallery ==
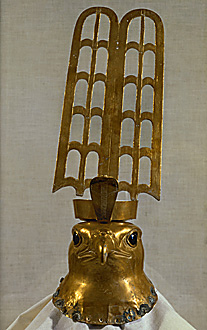
Horus, patron deity of Hierakonpolis (near Edfu), the predynastic capital of Upper Egypt. Its head was executed by means of beating the gold then connecting it with the copper body. A uraeus is fixed to the diadem which supports two tall openwork feathers. The eyes are inlaid with obsidian. Sixth Dynasty.

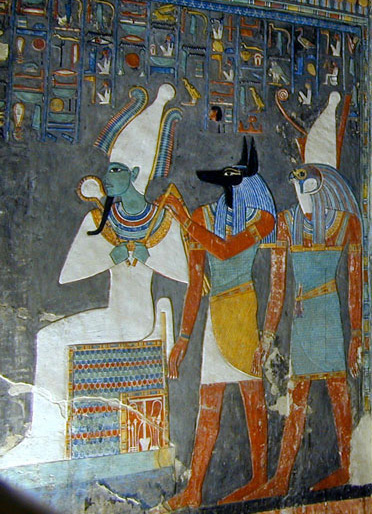
Horus (right) in the Tomb of Horemheb (KV57) in the Valley of the Kings

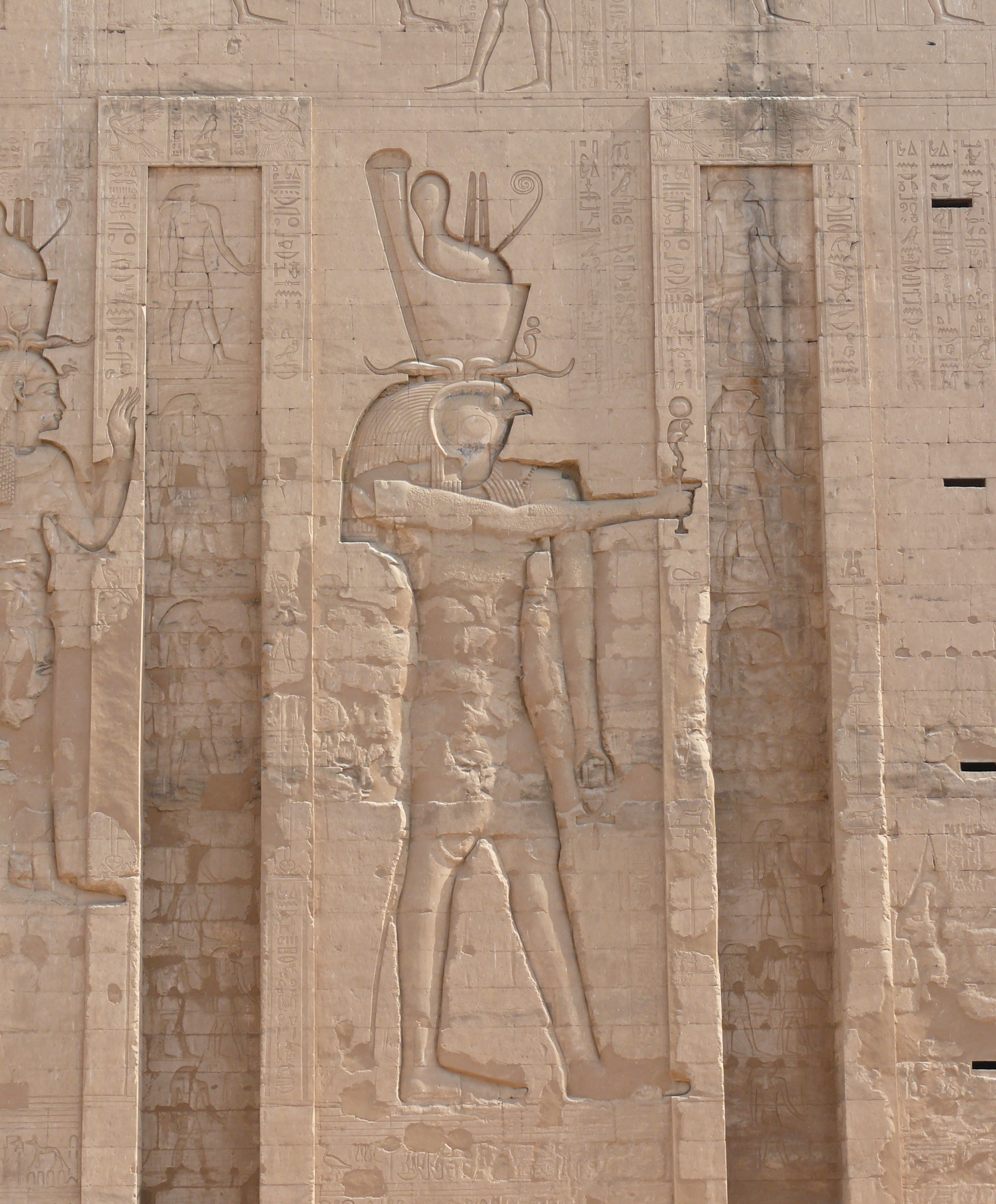
Horus relief in the Temple of Edfu

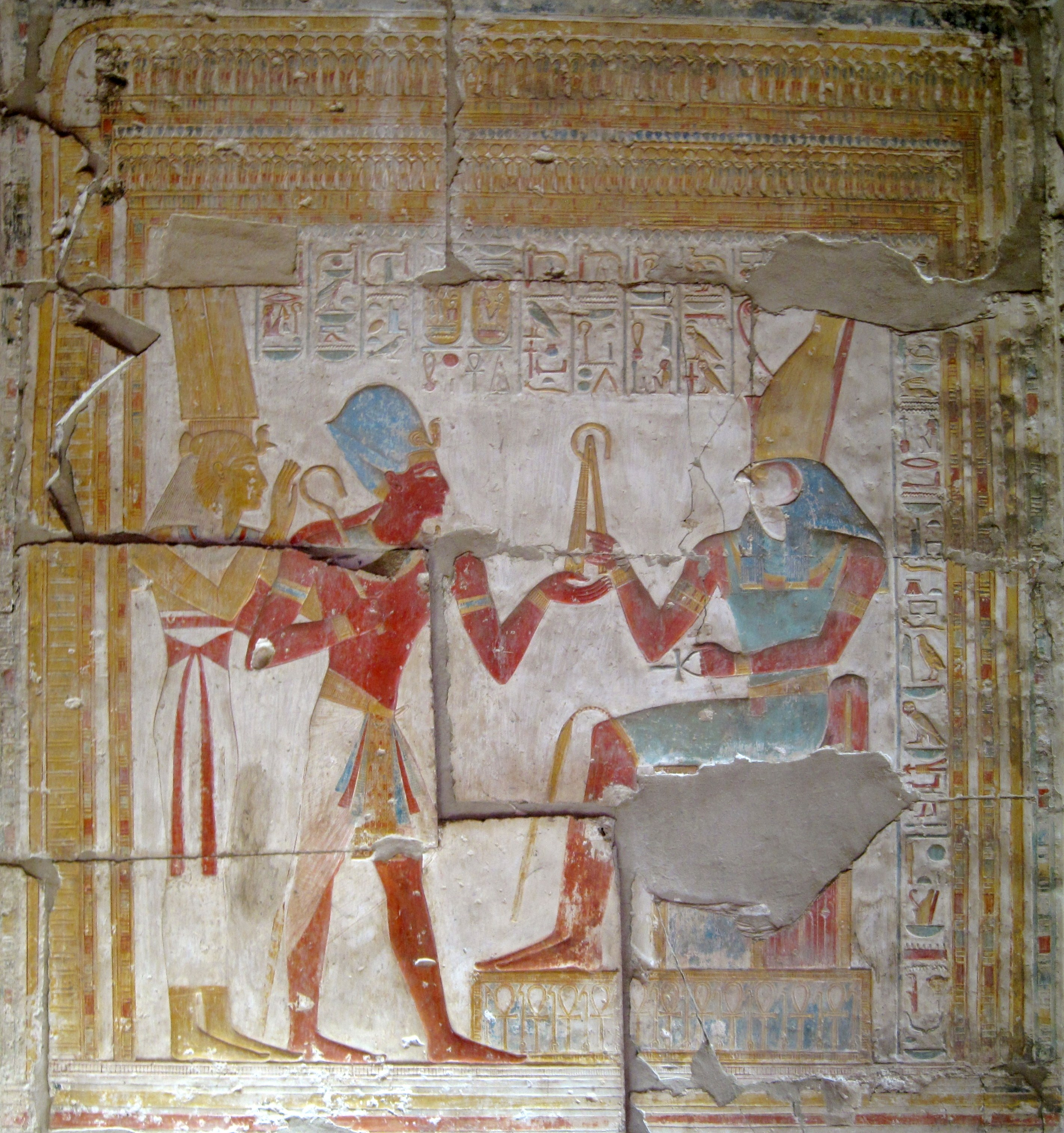
Relief in the temple of Seti I of pharaoh Seti I presenting an offering to Horus

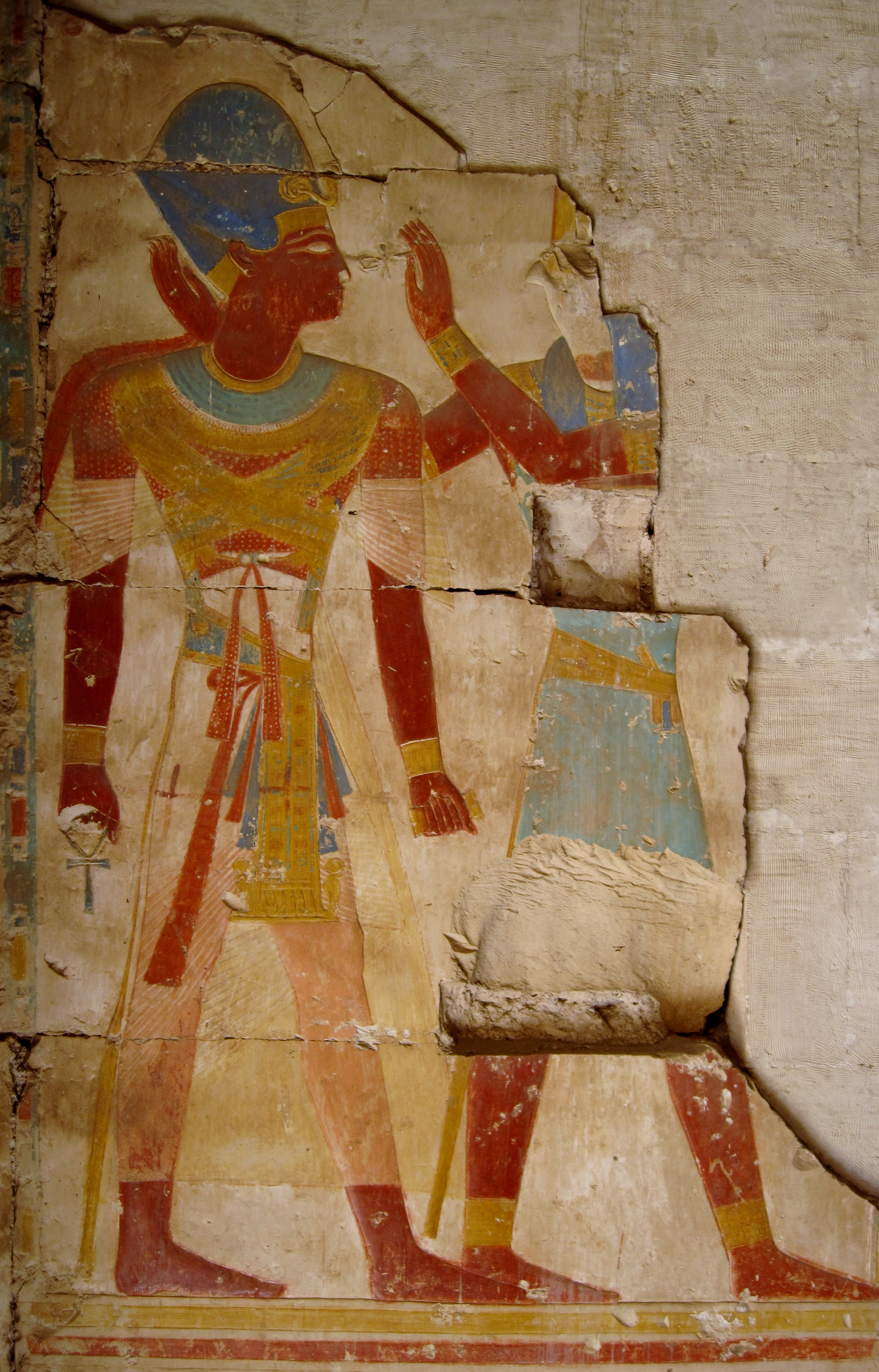
Fragment of a painted relief of pharaoh Ramesses II being accompanied by Horus

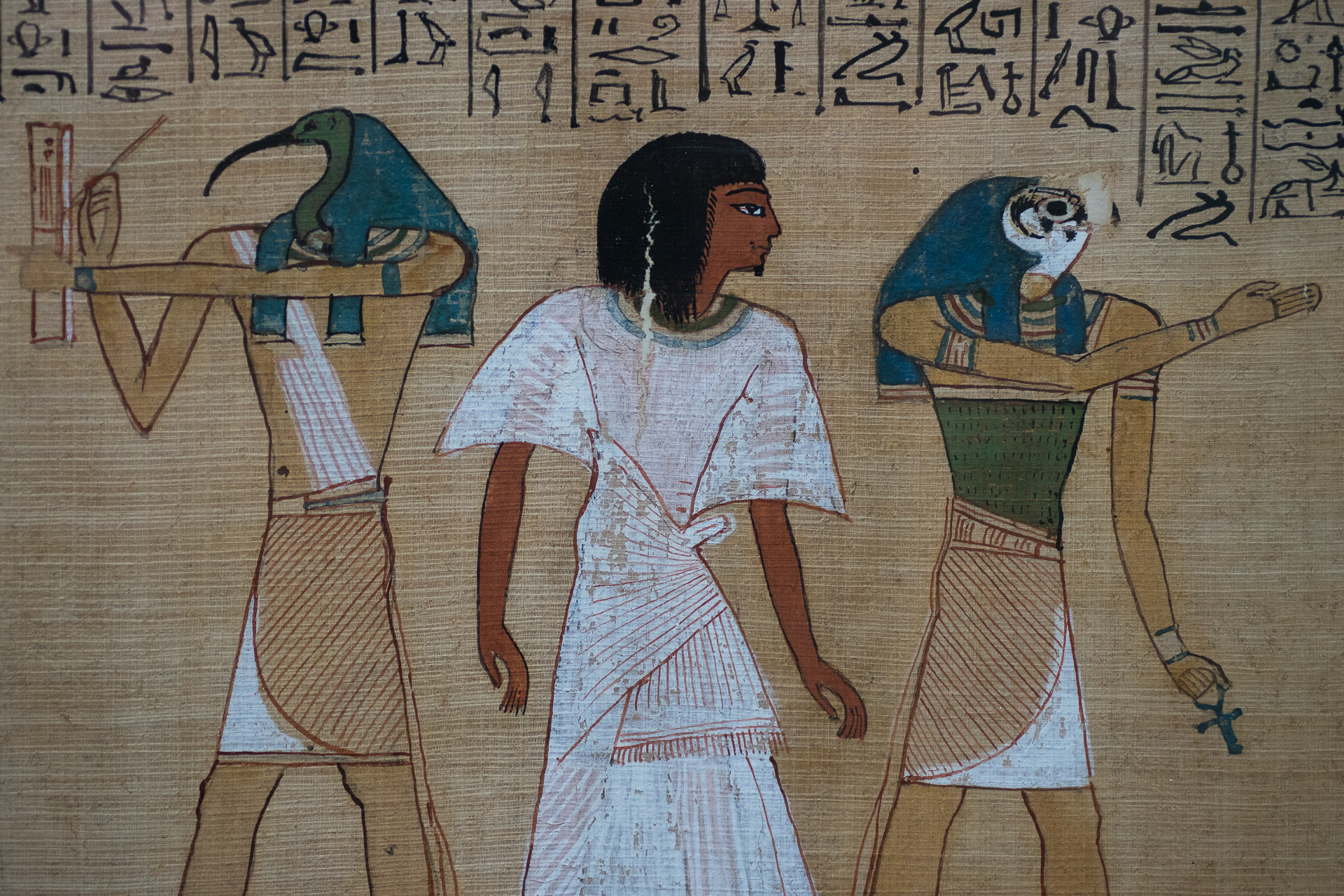
In Duat Horus conducts Hunefer to a shrine in which Osiris sits enthroned

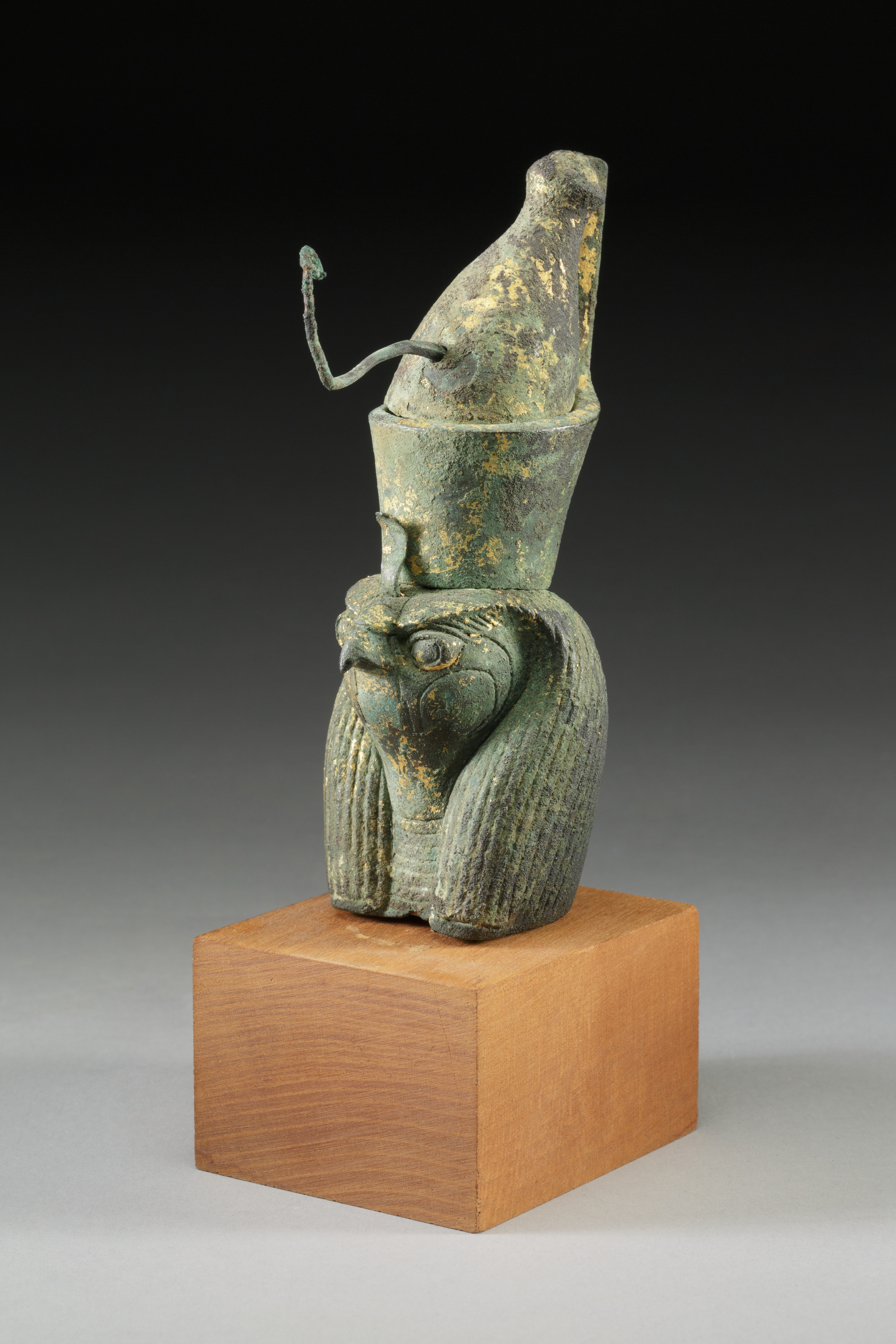
Head of Horus statue, 664–30 BCE, Late Period–Ptolemaic Period

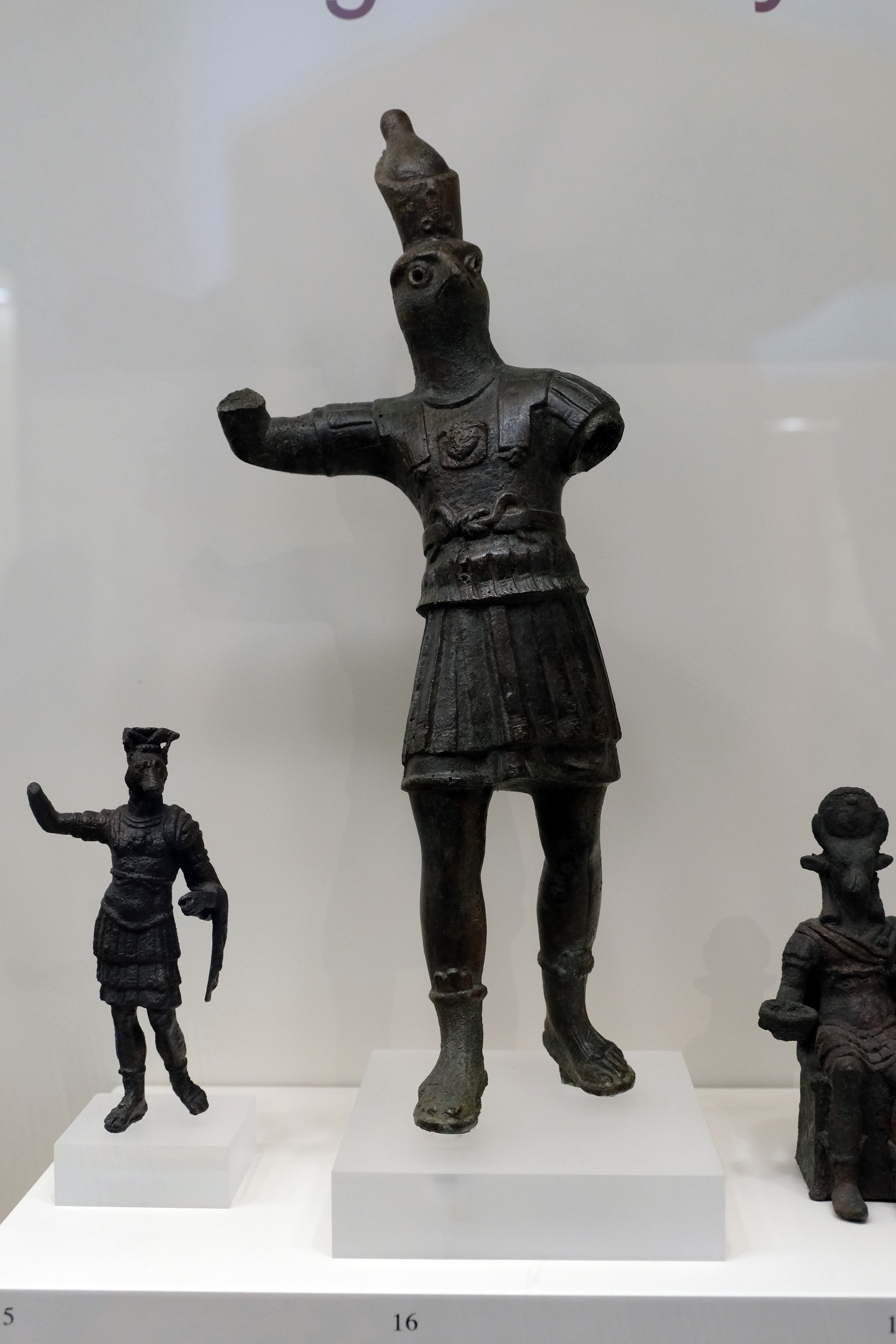
Copper-alloy of Horus (centre) as a Roman officer with contrapposto stances (National Archaeological Museum, Athens)

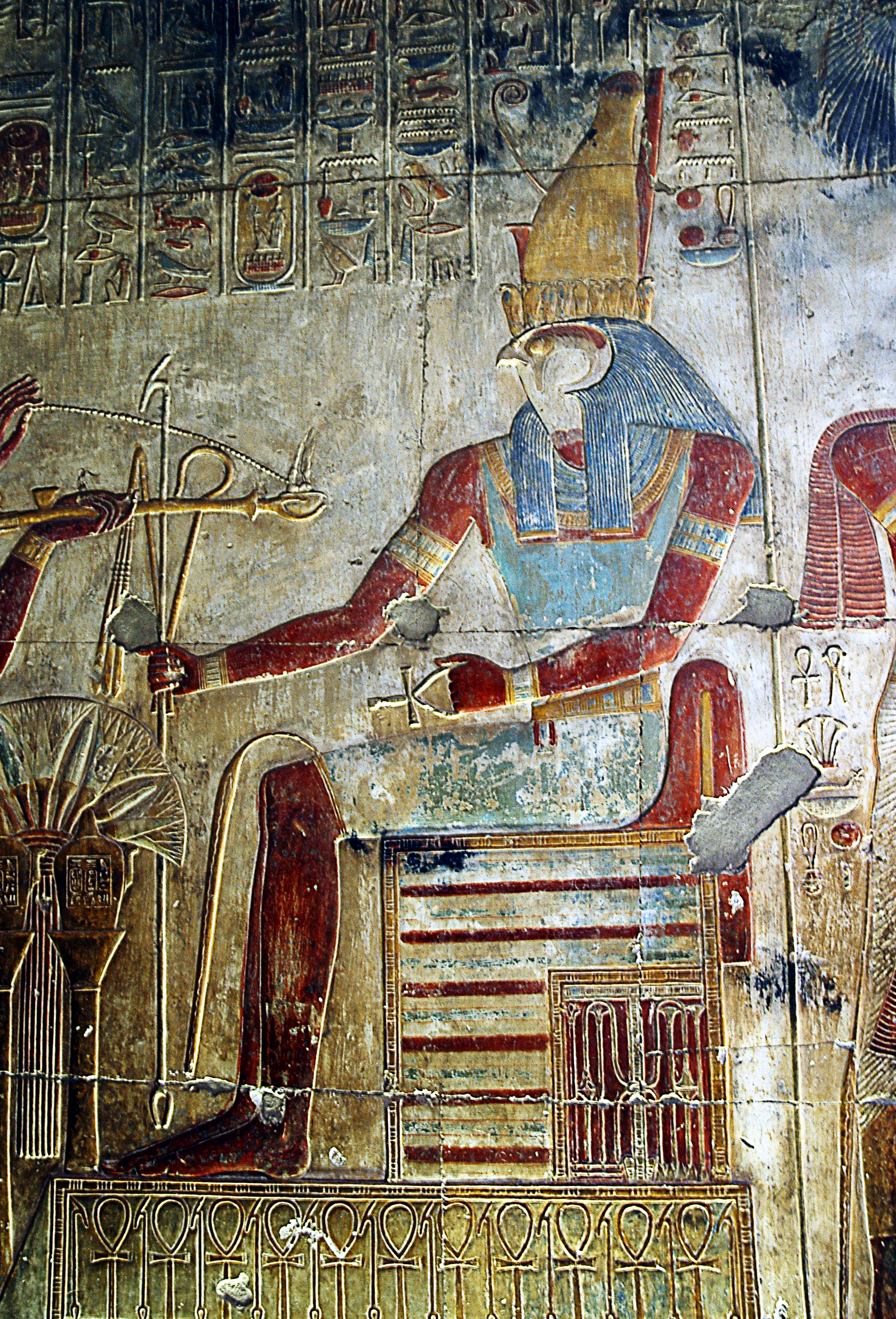
Relief of Horus in the temple of Seti I in Abydos

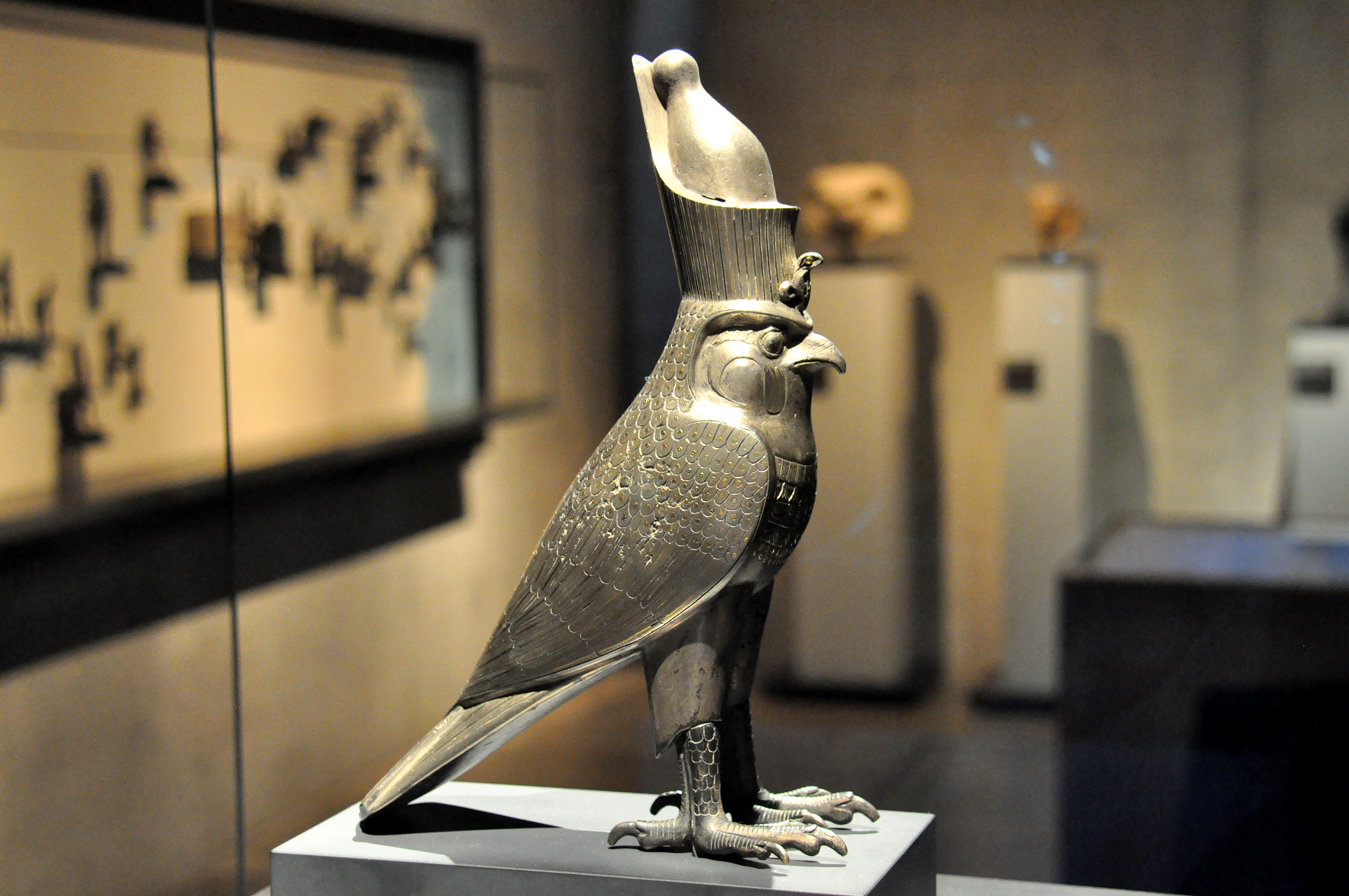
God Horus as a falcon wearing the Double Crown of Egypt. 27th dynasty. State Museum of Egyptian Art, Munich

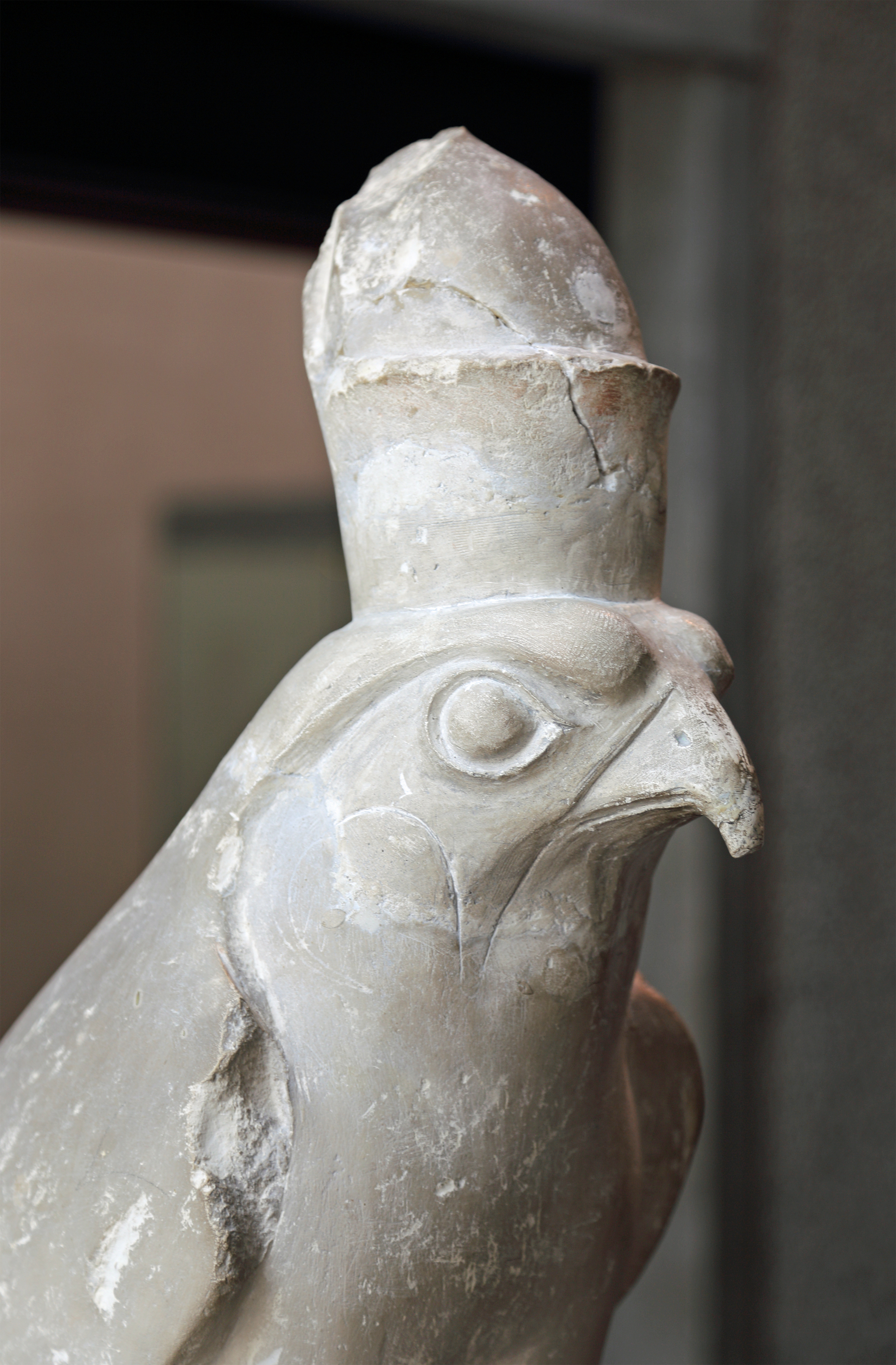
Statue of Horus from the reign of Amenhotep II (Eighteenth Dynasty, c. 1400 BCE) in the Musée royal de Mariemont, Belgium

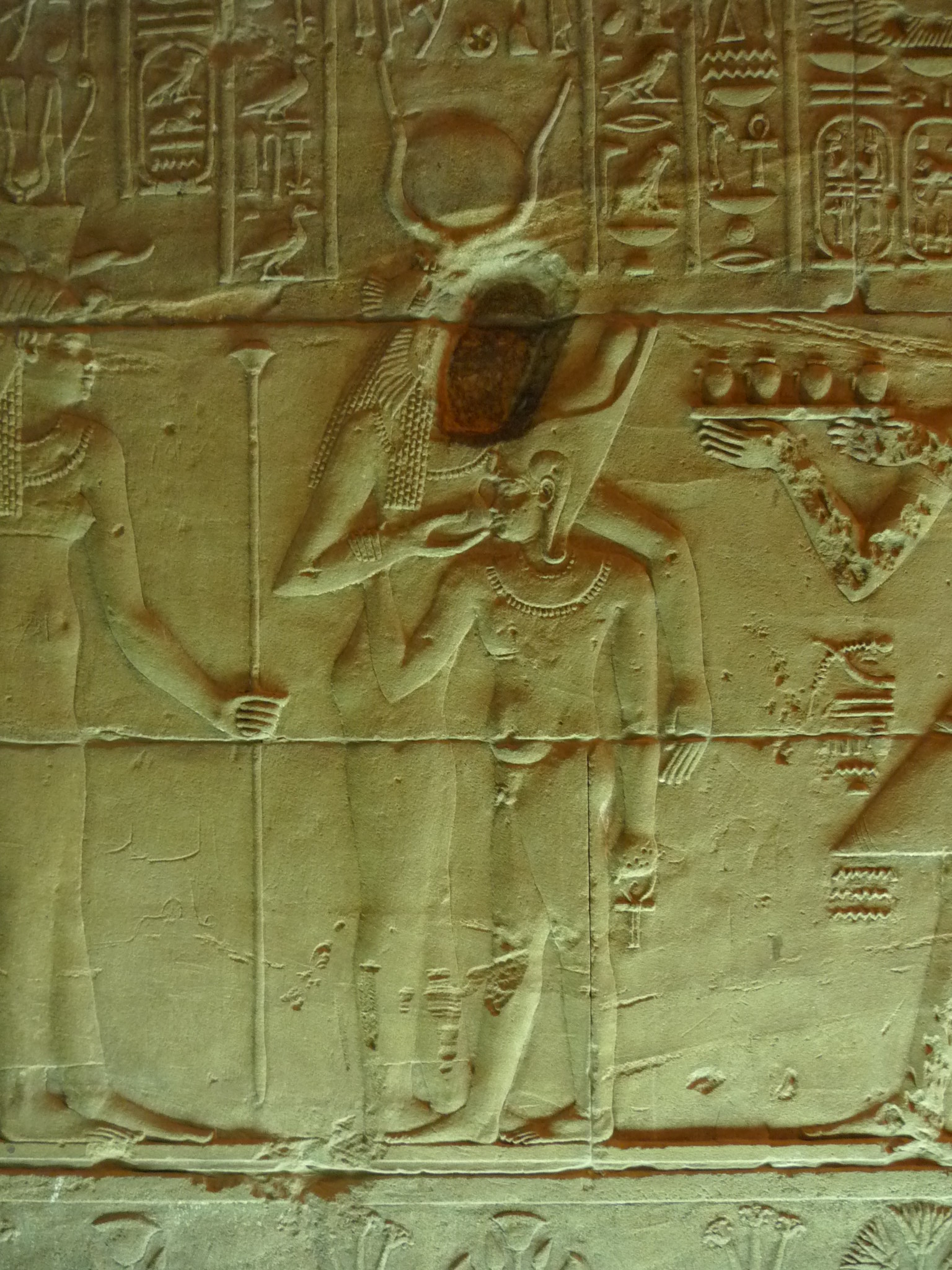
Isis breast-feeding young Horus, Isis Temple, Philae Island

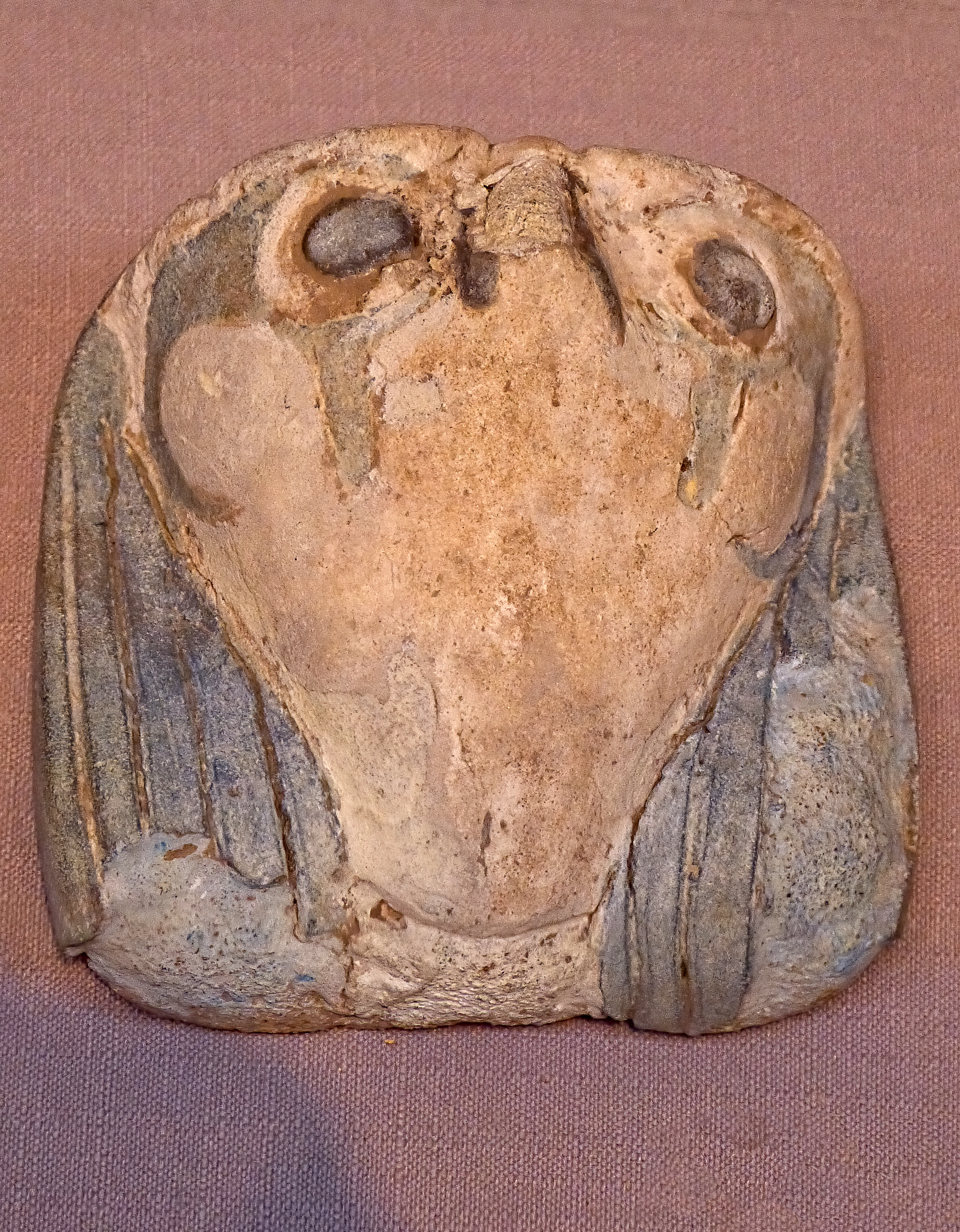
Head of Horus from Memphis, 1196 BCE, Penn Museum

Horus represented in relief with Wadjet and wearing the double crown. Mortuary Temple of Hatshepsut

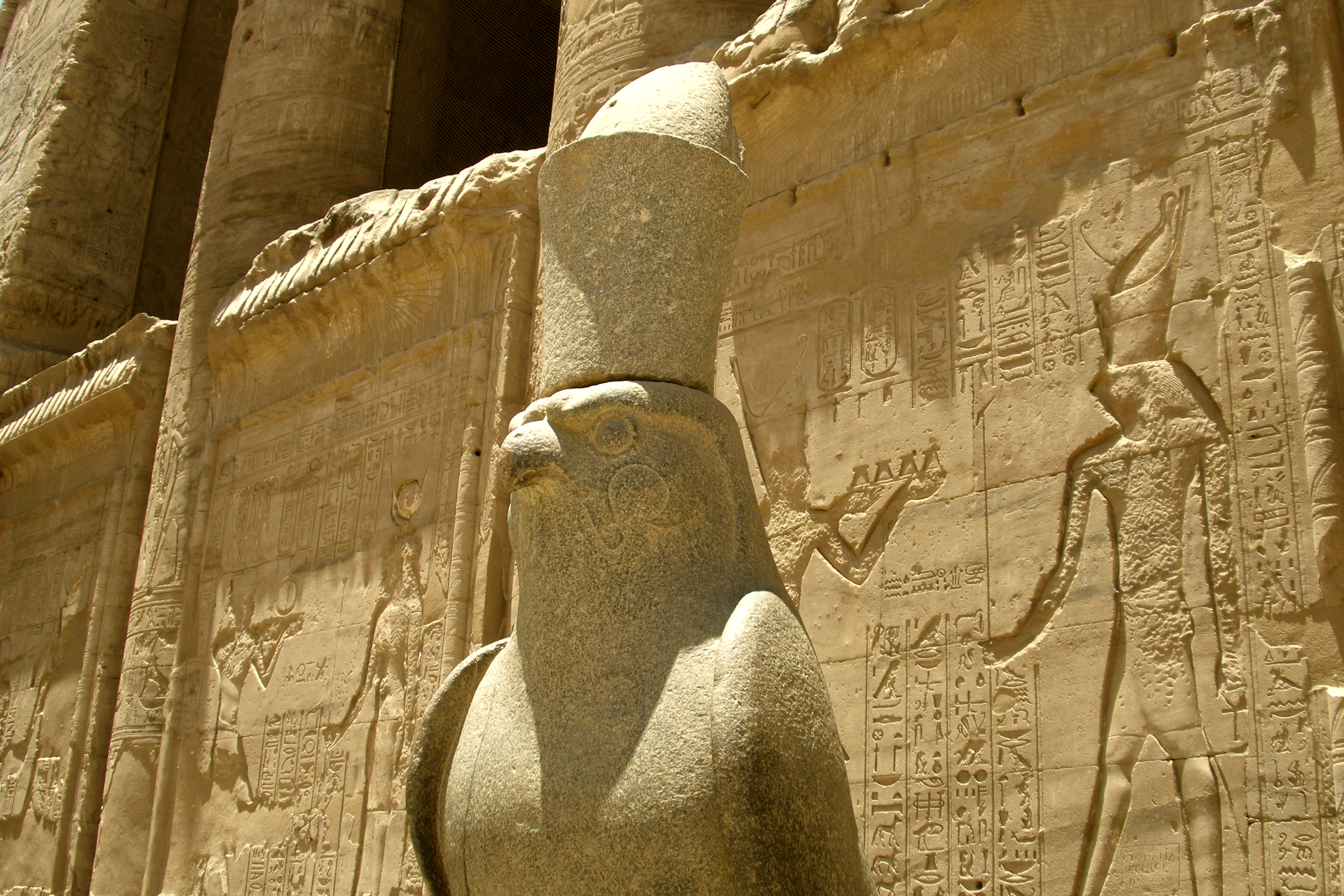
Statue of Horus in the Temple of Edfu

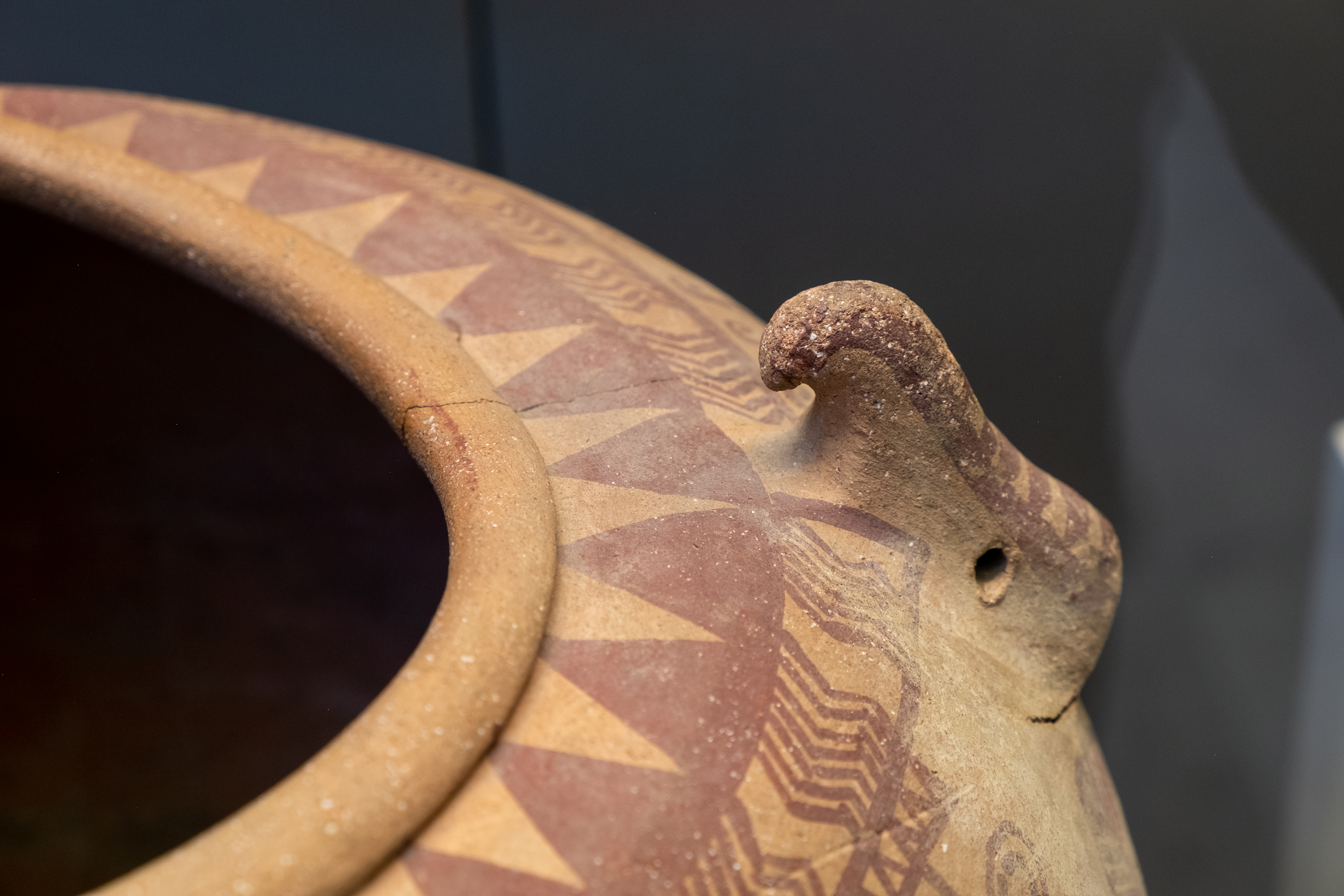
Falcon Horus, deity of Hierakonpolis, on a Naqada IIC jar, c. 3500 BCE, British Museum EA36328.

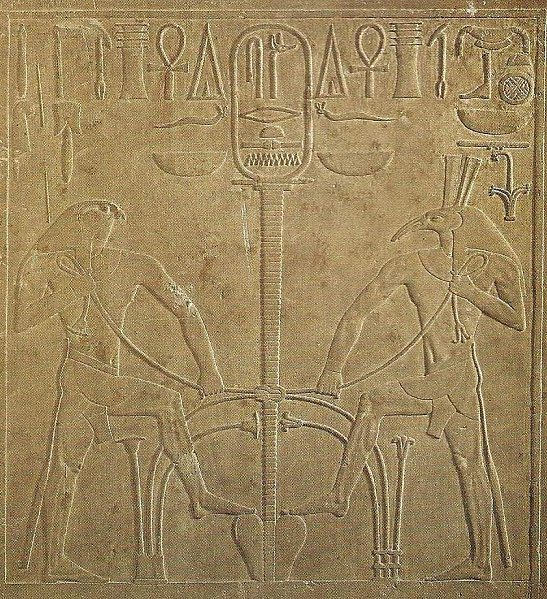
Horus and Set binding together upper and lower Egypt

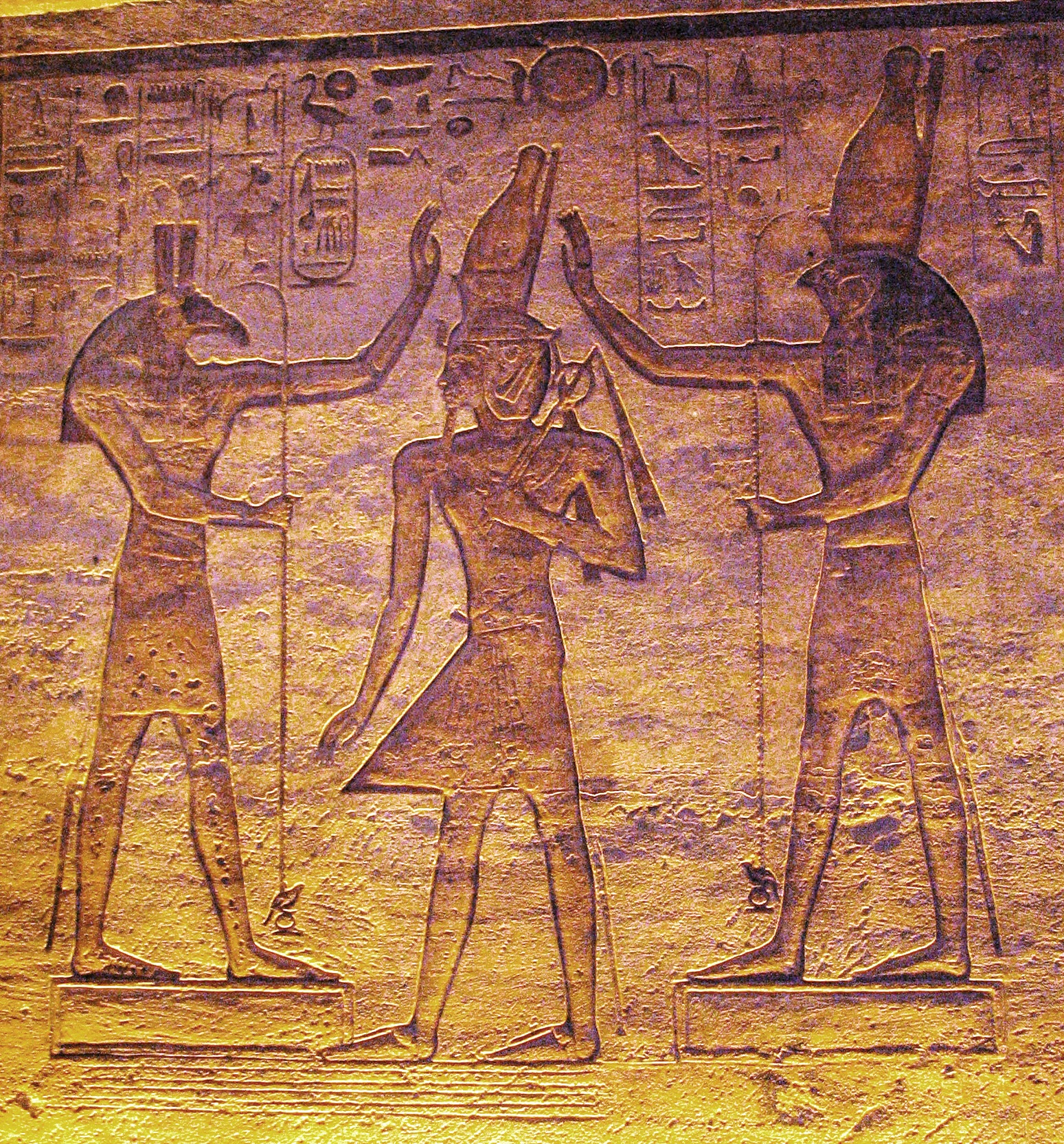
Relief of Ramses II (ruled 1279 - 1213 BCE) being crowned by Horus (on right in photo) and Set in the Small Temple at Abu Simbel

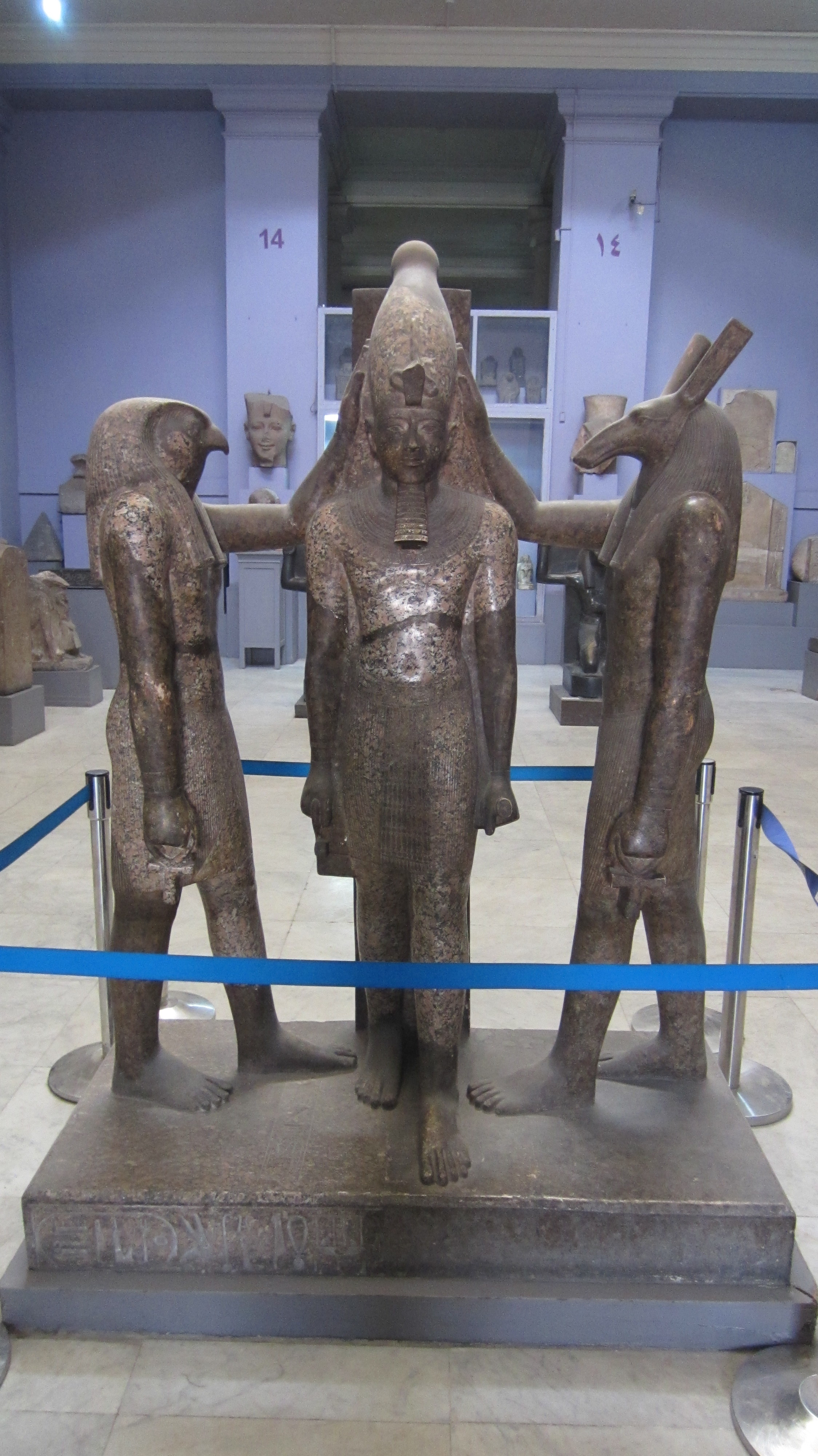
Horus (left) and Set (right) blessing Ramesses III in this statue, currently located in the Egyptian Museum

Hieroglyphs depicting Horus, as defined in the Unicode table

== See also ==
- Sky deity
- Hawk of Quraish
- Hauron, Egyptian deity
- Way of Horus
