= Kourotrophos =

Greek god and divine epithet

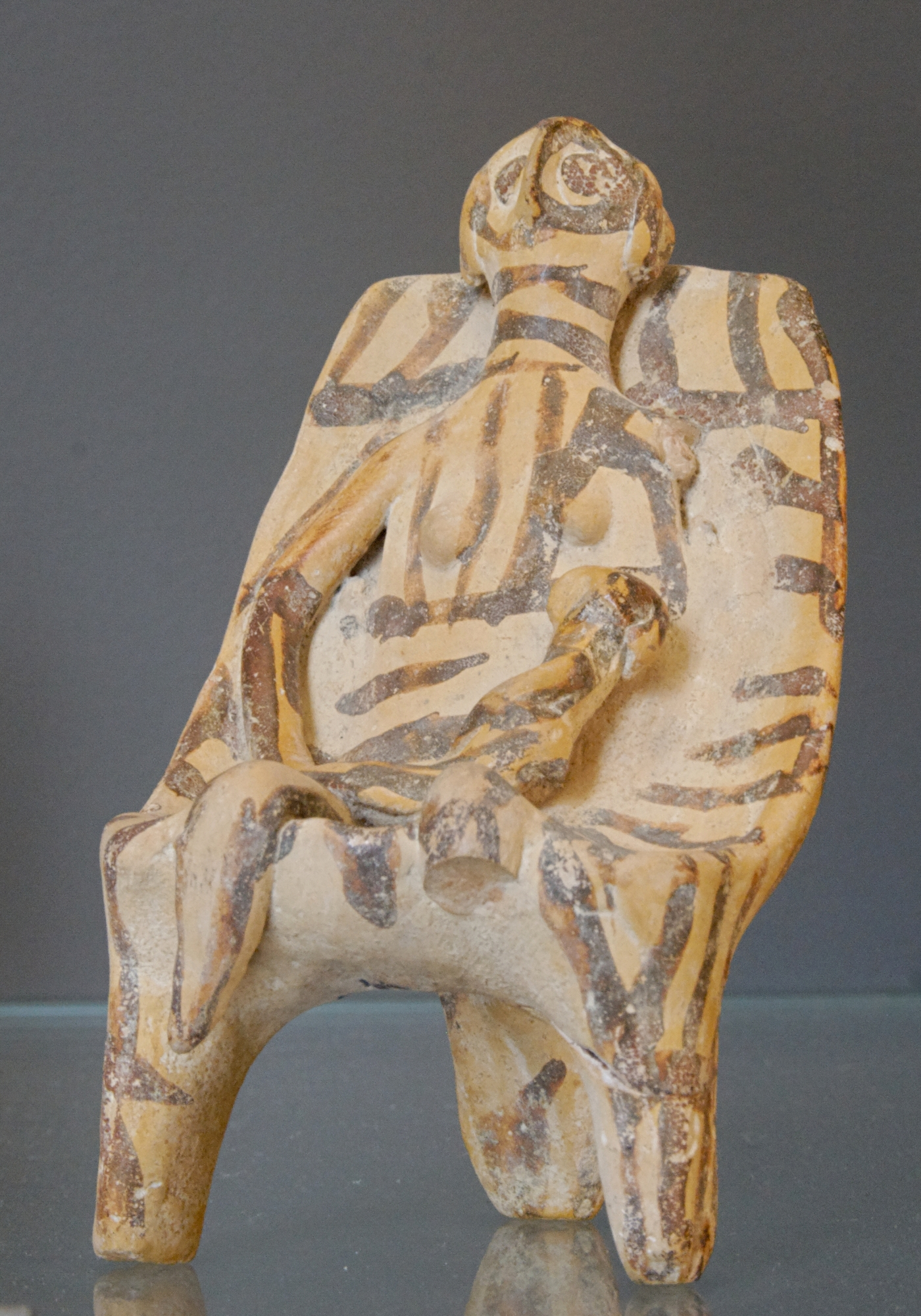
Late Mycenaean Kourotrophe phi-figurine (circa 1360 B.C.E.) (Louvre)

Kourotrophos (Greek: κουροτρόφος 'child nurturer') is the name that was given in ancient Greece to gods and goddesses whose properties included their ability to protect young people. Numerous gods are referred to by the epithet such as Athena, Leto, Apollo, Hermes, Hecate, Aphrodite, Artemis, Eileithyia, Demeter, Gaia, Cephissus and Asclepius. They were usually depicted holding an infant in their arms. Deianeria and Ariadne were occasionally shown on vases with their children, Hyllus and Staphylos and Oenopion respectively, but there is no evidence that there was a cult around them as kourotrophic figures.

Kourotrophos was also the name of a goddess or goddesses worshiped independently in shrines of their own. For example, Kourotrophos was a deity of the city of Athens but was not among the major Olympian deities. She appeared as the protector of children and young people and a sanctuary was built in her name in honor of the cult, the Kourotropheion. Kourotrophos was a major figure of cult, appearing in sacrifice groups connected with fertility and child care.

Kourotrophos is similar to the Dea Gravida, which are figures representing either a goddesses or woman who is visibly pregnant.

== Votive figures ==
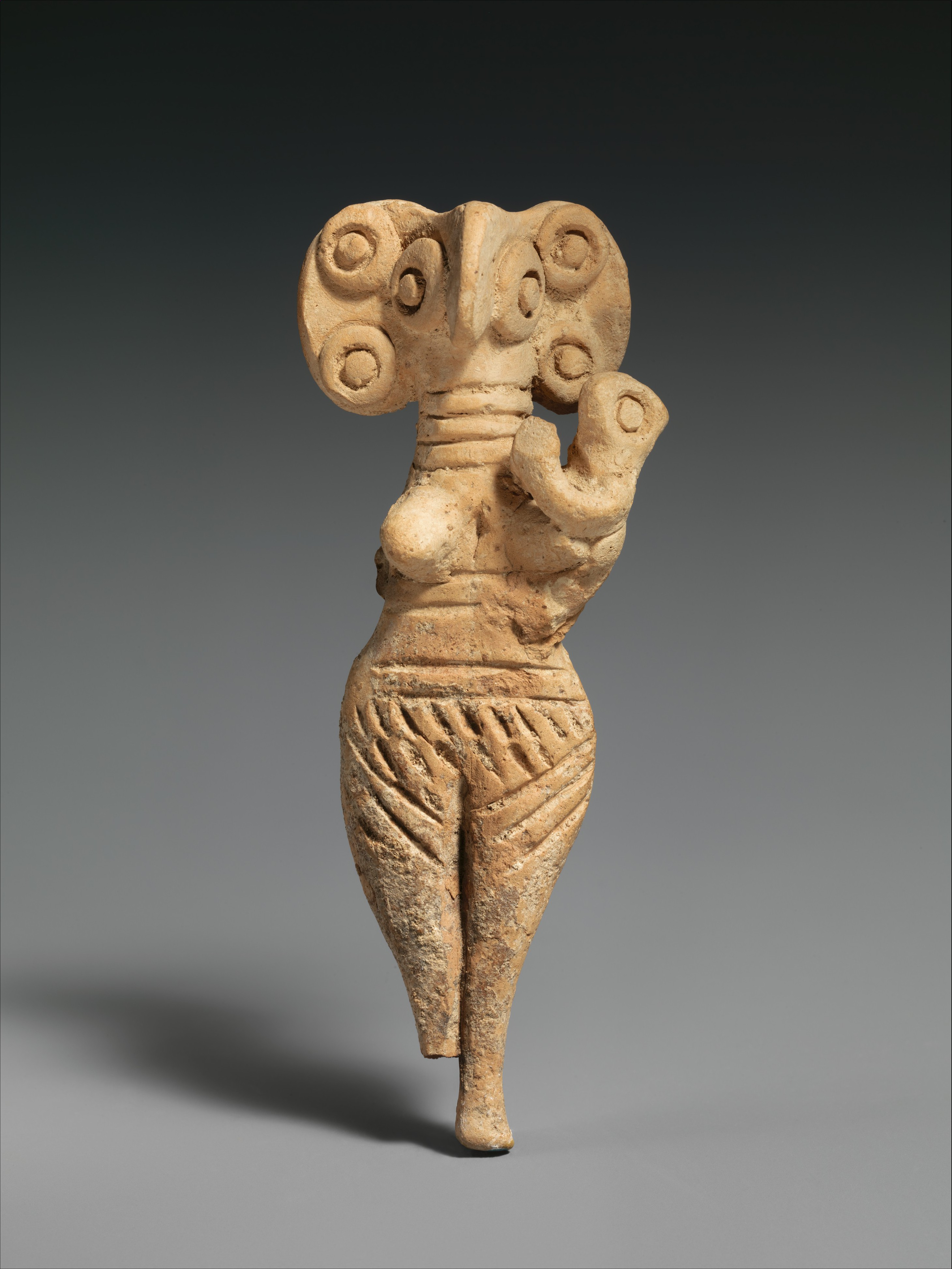
A terracotta Cypriot kourotrophos depicting a bird faced deity, circa 1450-1200 B.C.E. (Metropolitan Museum of Art)

The term kourotrophos (plural kourotrophoi) or the adjective kourotrophic is used to describe female figurines depicted with infants, which may depict either mortal women or divinities. These figures have been considered as symbols of fertility. Cyprus was notable for its production of plank figure Kourotrophos during the Early Cypriot III to the Middle Cypriot I periods (approximately 2000-1800 B.C.E.). Most kourotrophoi from this era stand 20 to 30 cm tall and were fashioned in a variety of materials, such as limestone and terracotta. They hold infants, who are typically within cradleboards, to their left shoulder. There have been at least two Cypriot figures from this period that show the figure nursing an infant, and two figures that are depicted sitting with the infant on their laps. Currently, all kourotrophic figures where the location of artifact was found is known have been found in tombs, however, this does not mean they were exclusively used to represent death/afterlife, as most figures do not have data on where they were found. Additionally, in general, plank figures, not exclusively kourotrophoi, have been associated with less than 10% of all Bronze Age burials and some show indications, such as repairs, that they were used in daily life. There is evidence that cradle-boarding was used on Cyprus during the Bronze Age, with signs of incidental skull shaping occurring in the Early and Middle Bronze Age and deliberate skull shaping during the Late Bronze Age, aligning with the time period for these figures depicting cradle-boarded infants.

Maternal figurines waned in popularity on Cyprus during the Late Bronze despite being a uniquely popular subject in comparison to other surrounding cultures since the Neolithic Age, as contact with the foreign cultures led to cultural shifts. It may be argued that the importance of women as life givers decreased during this time period. The creation of kourotrophic figures continued, however, they were given bird faces with notable beaks and were depicted as significantly more voluptuous than previous plank figures, likely being inspired by similar figures that where already produced in the Near East. It has been proposed that these figures do not represent ordinary women but deities. Interest in maternal figures increased again in Cyprus during the Archaic Age.

The reason for the creation of kourotrophic figures is debated, as the figures being representations of a great goddess, fertility charms, childbirth charms/aids, or companions to the dead have all been proposed.
