= Taweret =

Ancient Egyptian goddess

- The goddess Taweret, portrayed as a bipedal hippopotamus with limbs like those of a feline. Her hand rests on the sa sign, 𓎃, a hieroglyph that means 'protection' or 'lifesaver'.
Name in hieroglyphs
X1 G1 G36 D21 X1 I12
- Major cult center: Not applicable; Taweret was a household deity worshipped throughout Egypt.
- Symbol: the sa, ivory dagger, hippopotamus
- Consort: Bes

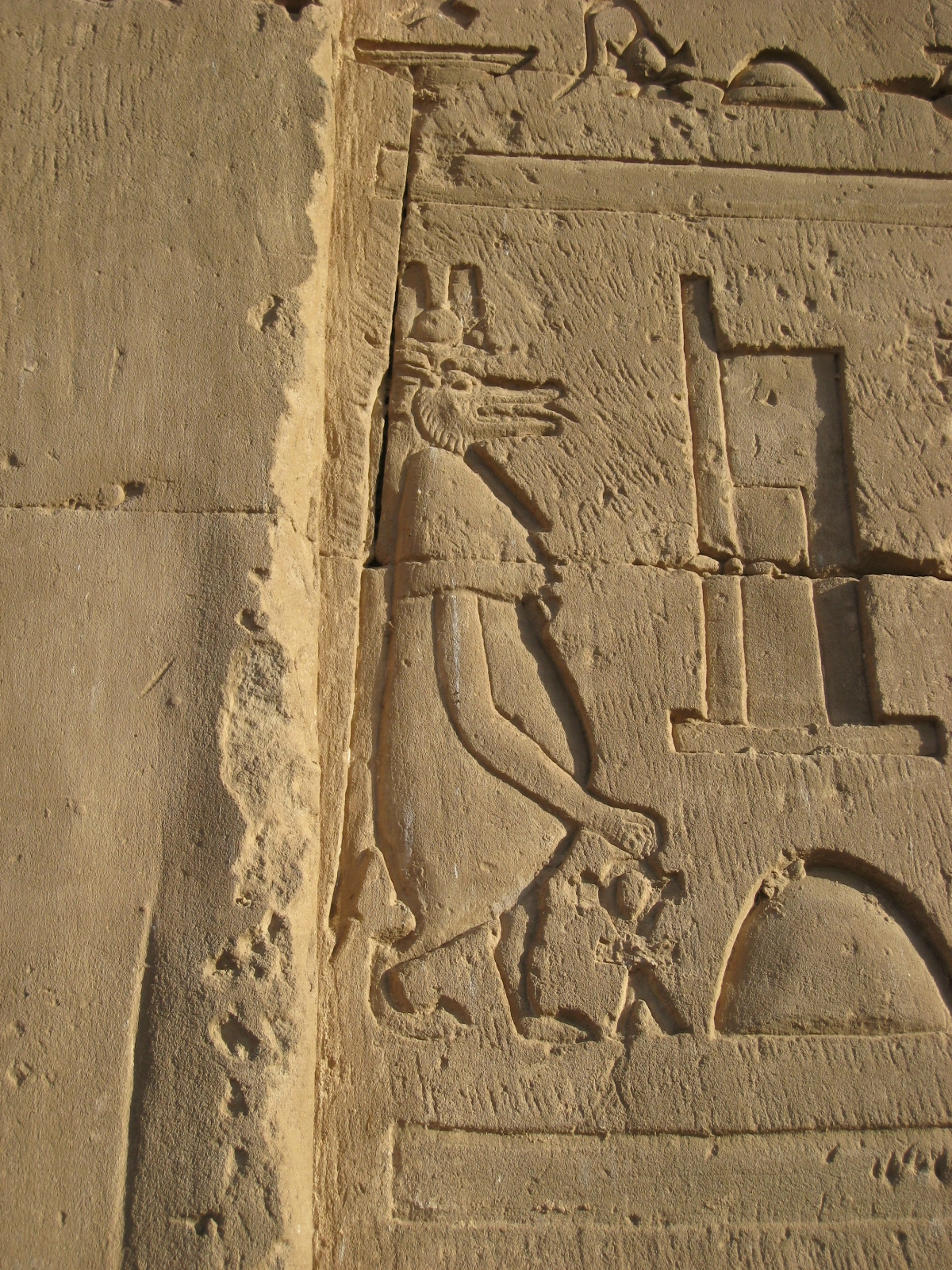
Images of protective deities like Taweret and Bes were placed on the outer walls of Ptolemaic temples in order to keep evil forces at bay. Edfu, Egypt.

In Ancient Egyptian religion, Taweret (Ancient Egyptian: tꜣ-wrt, also spelled Taurt, Tuat, Tuart, Ta-weret, Tawaret, Twert and Taueret, and in Ancient Greek: Θουέρις, romanized: Thouéris, Thoeris, Taouris and Toeris) is the protective goddess of childbirth and fertility. The name "Taweret" means "she who is great" or simply "great one", a common pacificatory address to dangerous deities. The deity is typically depicted as a bipedal female hippopotamus with feline attributes, pendulous female human breasts, the limbs and paws of a lion, and the back and tail of a Nile crocodile. She commonly bears the epithets "Lady of Heaven", "Mistress of the Horizon", "She Who Removes Water", "Mistress of Pure Water", and "Lady of the Birth House".

== History and development ==
Archaeological evidence demonstrates that hippopotamuses inhabited the Nile well before the dawn of Early Dynastic Period (before 3000 BCE). The violent and aggressive behavior of these creatures intrigued the people that inhabited the region, leading the ancient Egyptians both to persecute and to venerate them. From a very early age, male hippopotamuses were thought to be manifestations of chaos; consequently, they were overcome in royal hunting campaigns, intended to demonstrate the divine power of the king. However, female hippopotamuses were revered as manifestations of apotropaic deities, as they assiduously protect their young from harm. Protective amulets bearing the likenesses of female hippopotamuses have been found dating as far back as the Predynastic period (c. 3000–2686 BCE). The tradition of making and wearing these amulets continued throughout the history of Egypt into the Ptolemaic Kingdom and the Roman period (c. 332 BCE – 390 CE).

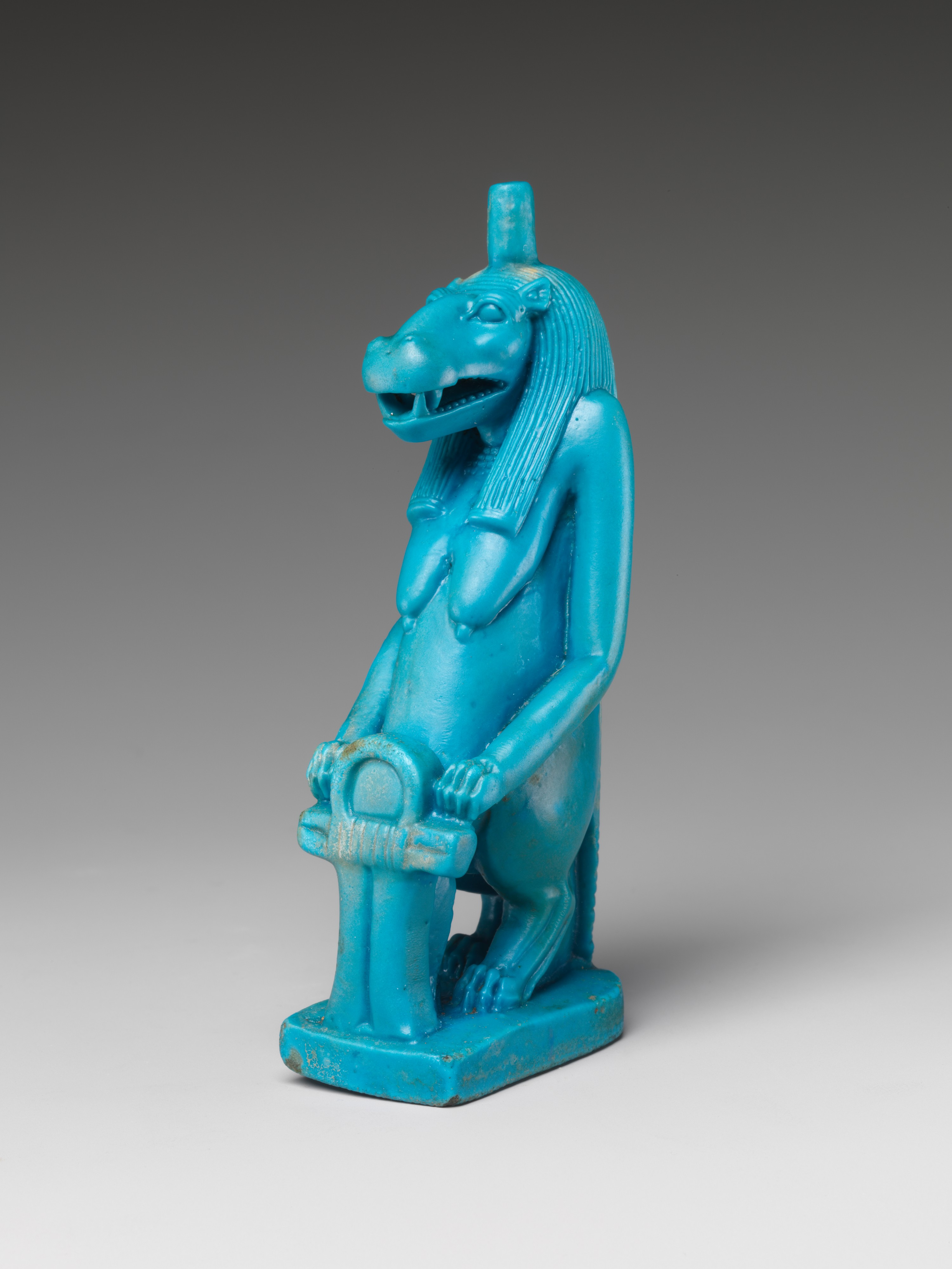
Faience statuette of Taweret, her hands resting on the sa.

From her ideological conception, Taweret was closely grouped with (and is often indistinguishable from) several other protective hippopotamus goddesses: Ipet, Reret, and Hedjet. Some scholars even interpret these goddesses as aspects of the same deity, considering their universally shared role as protective household goddesses. The other hippopotamus goddesses have names that bear very specific meanings, much like Taweret (whose name is formed as a pacificatory address intended to calm the ferocity of the goddess): Ipet's name ("the Nurse") demonstrates her connection to birth, child rearing, and general caretaking, and Reret's name ("the Sow") is derived from the Egyptians' classification of hippopotami as water pigs. However, the origin of Hedjet's name ("the White One") is not as clear and could justly be debated. Evidence for the cult of hippopotamus goddesses exists from the time of the Old Kingdom (c. 2686 – 2181 BCE) in the corpus of ancient Egyptian funerary texts entitled the Pyramid Texts. Spell 269 in the Pyramid Texts mentions Ipet and succinctly demonstrates her nurturing role; the spell announces that the deceased king will suck on the goddess's "white, dazzling, sweet milk" when he ascends to the heavens. As maternal deities, these goddesses served to nurture and protect the Egyptian people, both royal (as seen in the Pyramid Texts) and non-royal.

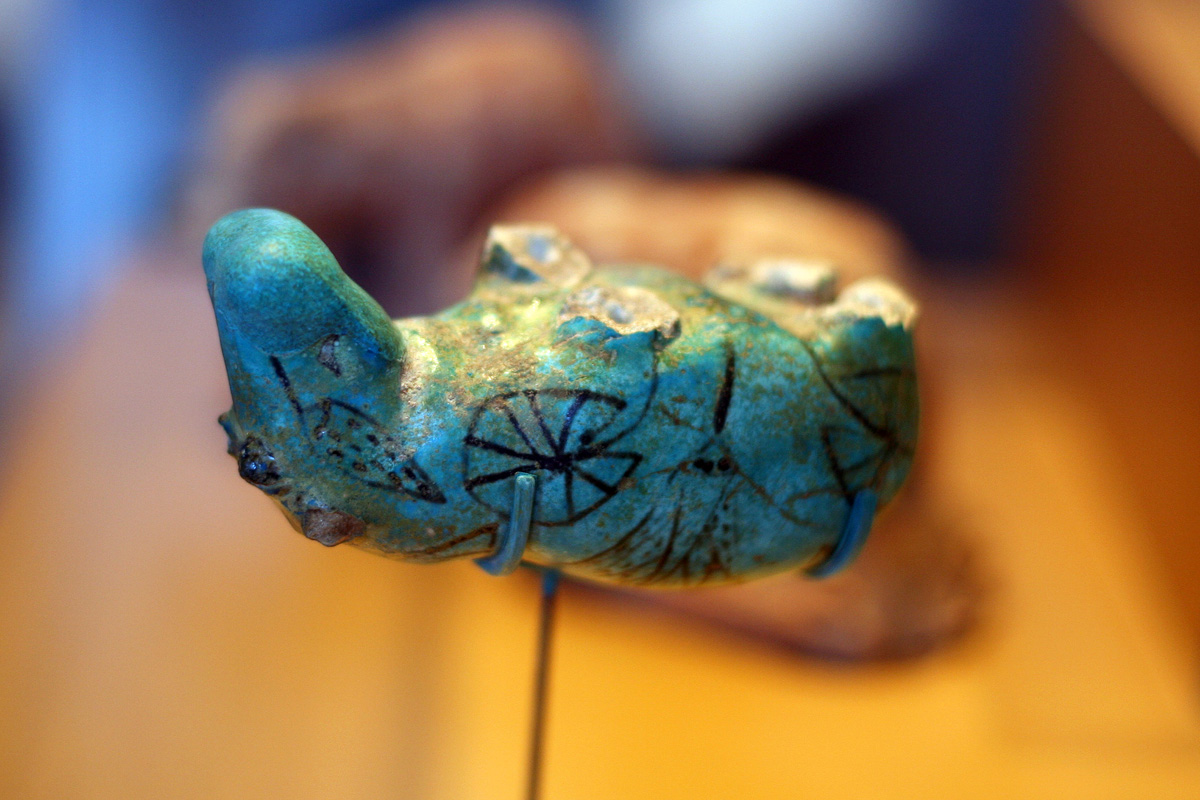
Faience hippopotamus statuettes, such as this one on display at the Brooklyn Museum, were placed in tombs and temples to help the deceased be successfully reborn into the afterlife.

It was not until the Middle Kingdom of Egypt (c. 2055–1650 BCE) that Taweret became featured more prominently as a figure of religious devotion. Her image adorns magical objects, the most notable of which being a common type of "wand" or "knife" carved from hippopotamus ivory that was likely used in rituals associated with birth and the protection of infants. Similar images appear also on children's feeding cups, once again demonstrating Taweret's integral role as the patron goddess of child rearing. Quite contrarily, she also took on the role of a funerary deity in this period, evidenced by the commonplace practice of placing hippopotami decorated with marsh flora in tombs and temples. Some scholars believe that this practice demonstrates that hippopotamus goddesses facilitated the process of rebirth after death, just as they aided in earthly births. These statues, then, assisted the deceased's passing into the afterlife.

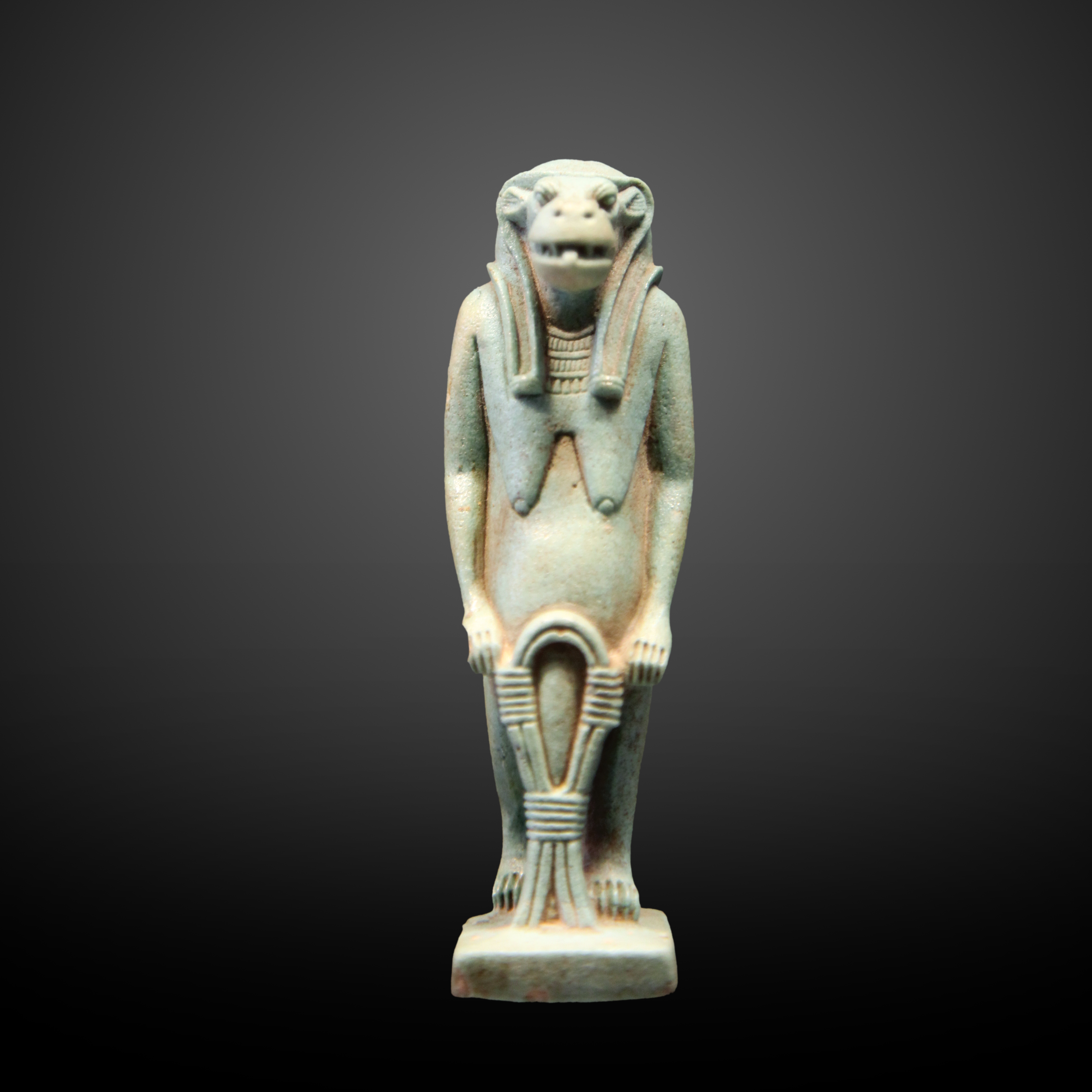
Faience amulet depicting Taweret, Late Period (c. 600-400 BCE), held in the Louvre Museum, Paris.

With the rise of popular piety in the New Kingdom (c. 1550–1069 BCE), household deities like Taweret gained even more importance. Taweret's image has been found on an array of household objects, demonstrating her central role in the home. In fact, such objects were even found at Amarna from the reign of Akhenaten (c. 1352–1336 BCE), a pharaoh of the Eighteenth Dynasty who reorganized ancient Egyptian religion into a monotheistic religion focused on the worship of the sun disc, called the Aten. The worship of many traditional gods was proscribed during this period, so Taweret's survival in the artistic corpus found at the Aten's capital demonstrates her overwhelming significance in daily life. In this time period, her role as a funerary deity was strengthened, as her powers became considered not only life-giving, but regenerative as well. Various myths demonstrate her role in facilitating the afterlives of the deceased as the nurturing and purifying "Mistress of Pure Water". However, Taweret and her fellow hippopotamus goddesses of fertility should not be confused with Ammit, another composite hippopotamus goddess who gained prominence in the New Kingdom. Ammit was responsible for devouring the unjust before passing into the afterlife. Unlike Ammit, the other hippopotamus goddesses were responsible for nourishment and aid, not destruction.

In the Ptolemaic and Roman periods (c. 332 BCE – 390 CE), Taweret maintained a central role in daily Egyptian life. In either the latter half of the Late Period (c. 664–332 BCE) or the early Ptolemaic period, a temple dedicated to Ipet was built at Karnak. This enigmatic temple was thought to witness the daily birth of the sun god from the hippopotamus goddesses that dwelled there. The sun god (Amun-Re) was conceived of as having multiple divine mothers, and by this later period in Egyptian history, Taweret and the other hippopotamus goddesses were included in this body of solar mothers. Taweret's image also appeared on the outside of temples dedicated to other deities due to her apotropaic ability to ward off malevolent forces. Outside of temple settings, the household cult of the goddesses remained strong, and amulets bearing their likenesses peaked in popularity during these years.

=== Outside of Egypt ===
Taweret developed a significant cult outside of Egypt as well. In the Middle Kingdom (c. 2055–1650 BCE), economic and minimal political contact with the Asiatic cultures of the Levant led to the exchange of ideologies. Taweret was adopted into Levantine religions, serving the same maternal role in these foreign pantheons.

==== Ancient Crete ====
Due to communication between Levantine coastal towns and Mediterranean localities, Taweret also became an integral part of Minoan religion in Crete, where it is known as the Minoan Genius.

Like in Egypt, her image was featured most prominently on protective amulets. However, this image was altered slightly from the Egyptian one, as she was folded into the corpus of Minoan iconography in an artistic style that was congruent with other Minoan images. From Crete, this image spread to mainland Greece, where the goddess was featured in palatine art in Mycenae.

==== In Nubia ====
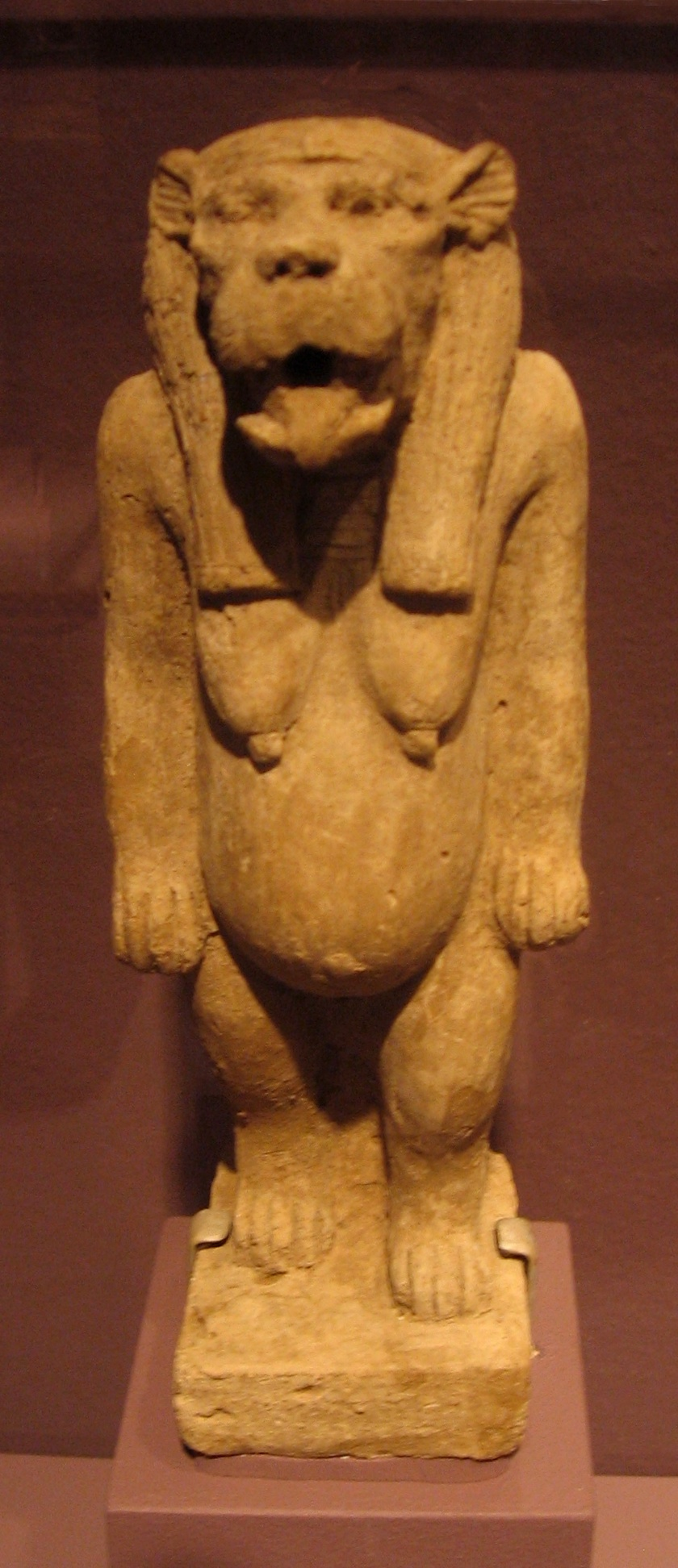
This clay statuette of Taweret was found in a foundation deposit under the enclosure wall of the pyramid of the Nubian King Anlamani (c. 623–595 BCE). Museum of Fine Arts, Boston.

The goddess was also adopted by the Nubians, the empire that lay directly south of Egypt in what is now Sudan. Like her Minoan counterpart, the Nubian Taweret became a part of the Nubian pantheon in the late Middle Kingdom of Egypt. She was evidently featured in royal rituals at Kerma, the capital of the empire.

==== Phoenicia ====
There is a connection to the Phoenician goddess of pregnancy Dea Gravida.

== In mythology ==
Although Ipet (aka Apet or Aptet) is mentioned in the Old Kingdom Pyramid Texts, and Taweret is seen frequently on Middle Kingdom ritual objects, hippopotamus goddesses did not gain a significant role in Egyptian mythology until the New Kingdom (c. 1550–1069 BCE). Taweret is featured in some versions of a popular and widespread myth in which the Eye of Ra becomes angry with her father and retreats to Nubia in the form of a lioness. Upon the Eye of Ra's eventual return to Egypt, she assumes the form of a hippopotamus (presumably Taweret) and consequently brings the flooding of the Nile. This myth demonstrates Taweret's primary function as a goddess of fertility and rejuvenation. Some scholars feel that her role in the Nile inundation is one of the reasons she was given the epithet "Mistress of Pure Water". However, her similar role in the rejuvenation of the dead also cannot be overlooked with regards to this epithet – just as she provided life for the living through physical birth and the inundation, she also cleansed and purified the dead so they could pass safely into the afterlife.

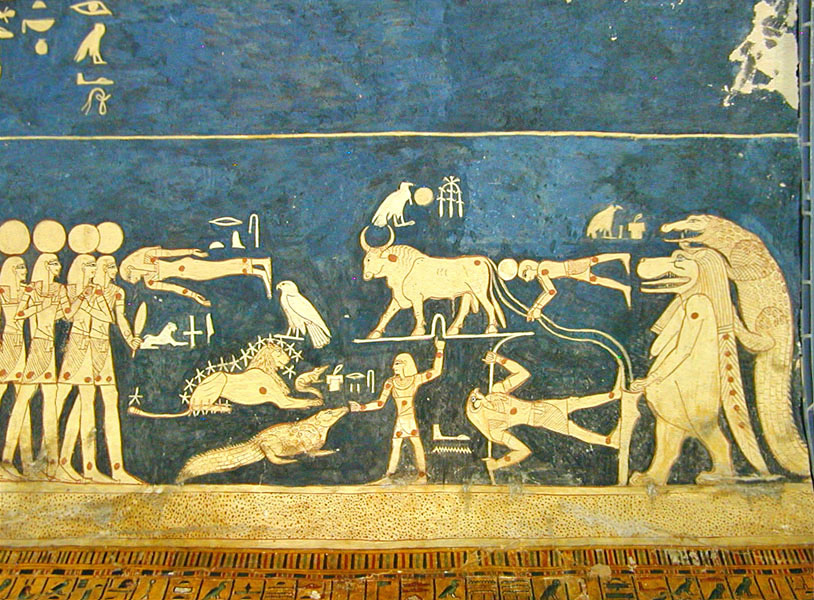
Detail of the astronomical ceiling in the tomb of Seti I. A celestial form of Taweret can be seen in the far right.

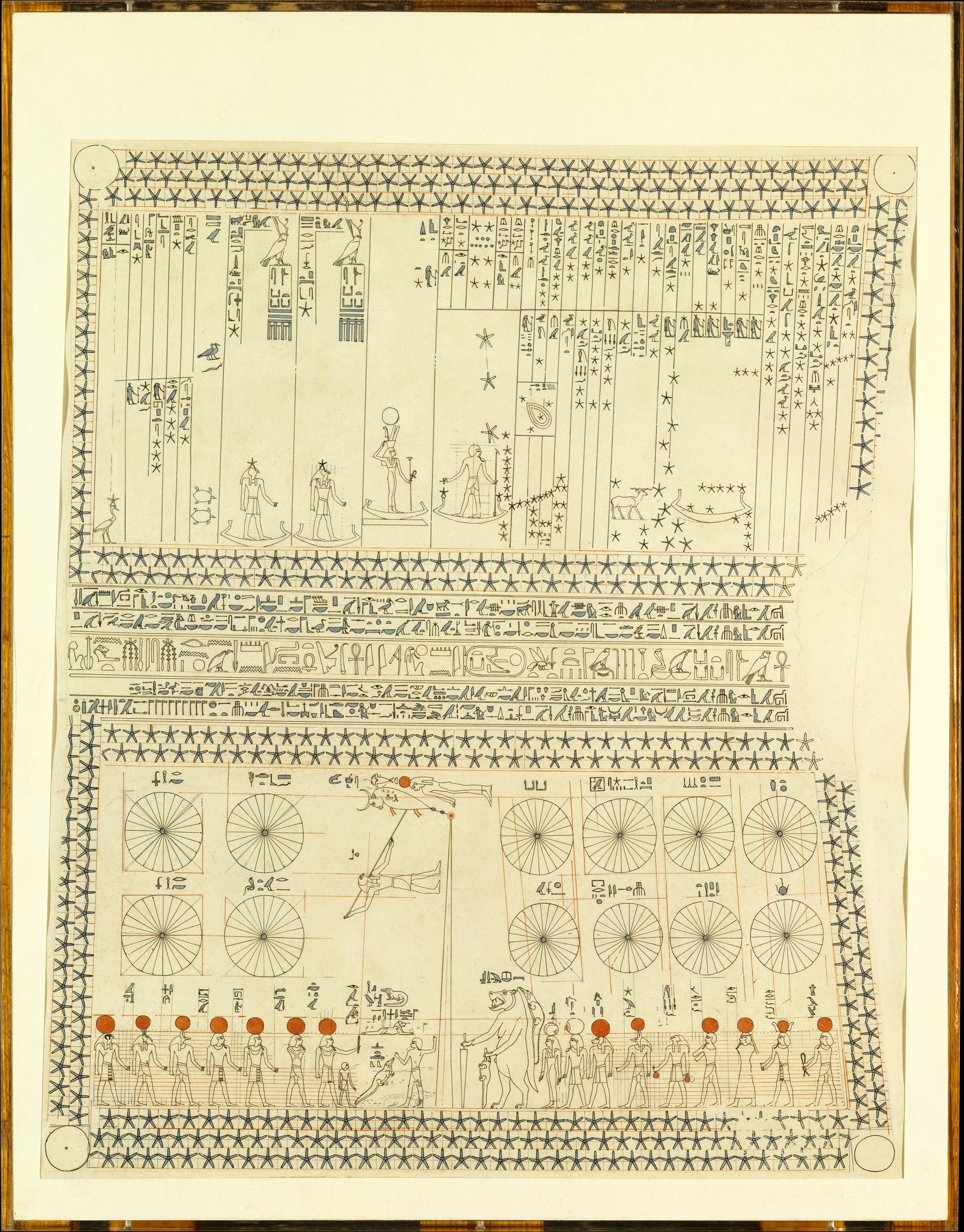
This image (c. 1463 BCE) shows the astronomical ceiling of Senemut's tomb. A celestial form of Taweret can be seen towards the bottom in the center.

In the New Kingdom Taweret's image was frequently used to represent a northern constellation in zodiacs. This image is attested in several astronomical tomb paintings, including the Theban tombs of Tharwas (tomb 353), Hatshepsut's famed advisor Senenmut (tomb 232), and the pharaoh Seti I (KV17) in the Valley of the Kings. The image of this astral Taweret appears almost exclusively next to the Setian foreleg of a bull. The latter image represents the Big Dipper and is associated with the Egyptian god of chaos, Seth. The relationship between the two images is discussed in the Book of Day and Night (a cosmically focused mythological text from the Twentieth Dynasty, c. 1186–1069 BCE) as follows: "As to this foreleg of Seth, it is in the northern sky, tied down to two mooring posts of flint by a chain of gold. It is entrusted to Isis as a hippopotamus guarding it." Although the hippopotamus goddess is identified in this text as Isis, not Taweret, this phenomenon is not uncommon in later periods of Egyptian history. When assuming a protective role, powerful goddesses like Isis, Hathor, and Mut assumed the form of Taweret, effectively becoming a manifestation of this goddess. Likewise, Taweret gradually absorbed qualities of these goddesses and is commonly seen wearing the Hathoric sun disc that is iconographically associated with both Hathor and Isis.

This cosmic image continues to be seen in later periods, although the tendency was to show such divine astral bodies more abstractly. One example can be found in the late Ptolemaic or early Roman Book of the Faiyum, a local monograph dedicated to the Faiyum and its patron gods, namely Sobek-Re. Taweret is depicted in her standard form with a crocodile on her back and a small upright crocodile in her right hand. She is shown in the section of the papyrus that is meant to depict the Faiyum's central Lake Moeris. The papyrus depicts the solar journey of Re with Lake Moeris as the place into which the sun god descends for his nightly journey, traditionally thought of as the underworldly realm of the Amduat. Taweret appears here as a well known constellation to demonstrate the celestial and otherworldly properties of Lake Moeris. She also serves as a fine protective divine mother to Sobek-Re during his precarious journey. In this respect, she fulfills the role of Neith, the primary divine mother of Sobek. This Taweret figure is labeled as "Neith the Great, who protects her son", demonstrating the malleability of the hippopotamus goddess form. When in the role of a protective mother, it is not uncommon that other goddesses would appear in the form of Taweret.

Taweret was featured in other myths as well during these later periods. In the famed Metternich Stela, Isis tells Horus that he was reared by a "sow and a dwarf", almost certainly referring to Taweret and her fellow apotropaic demon-god Bes, respectively. Although the date of this stela is relatively late, the central role of Taweret in the successful raising of children is still being stressed, showing the continuity of her character. She is also mentioned in Plutarch's notes on the central myth of Isis and Osiris. She joined the forces of order and helped Horus to defeat Set.

== In art ==
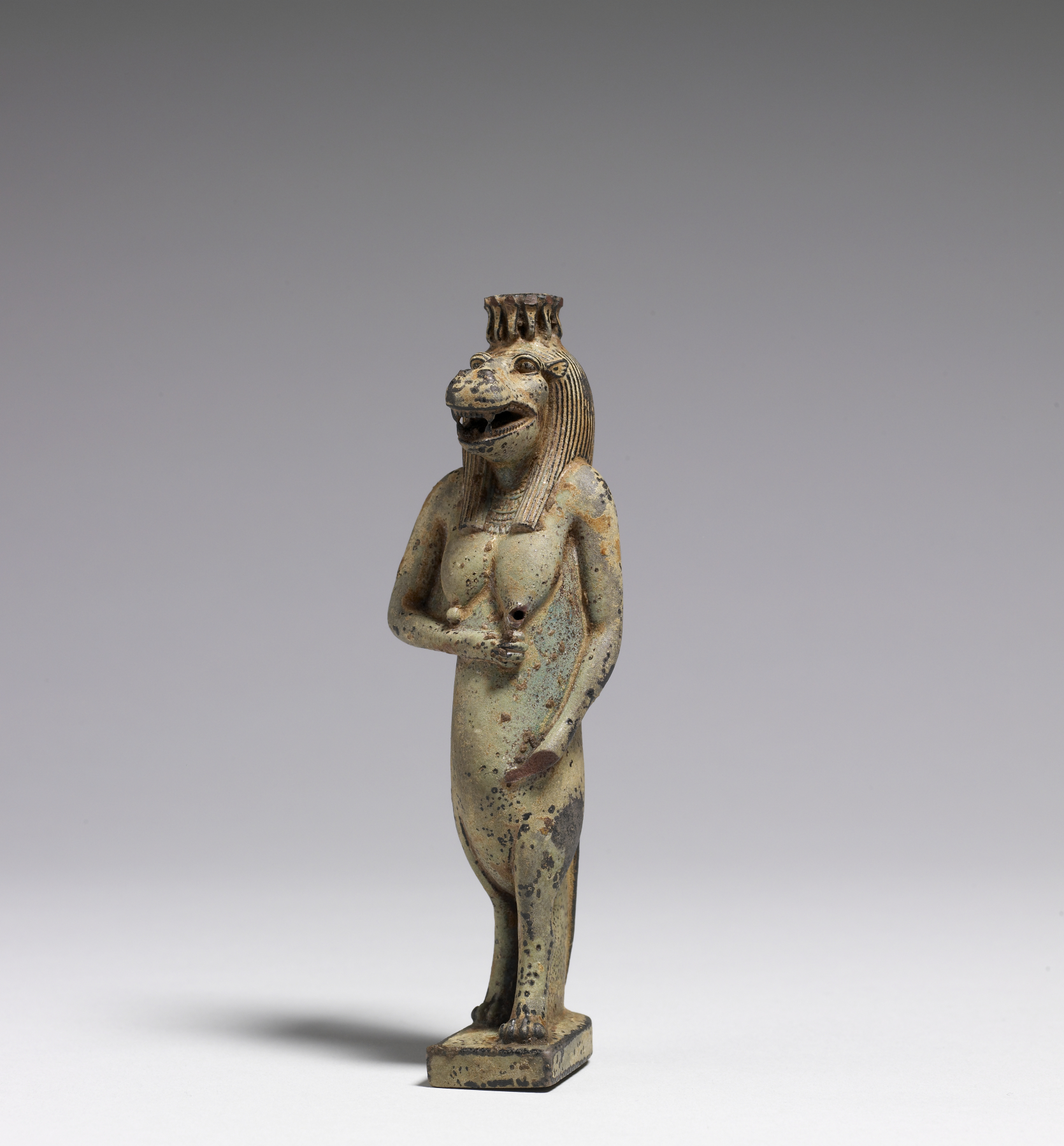
This faience vessel from the early Ptolemaic period (4th century BCE) is molded in the form of Taweret and was perhaps used to ritually cleanse liquid. Walters Art Museum, Baltimore.

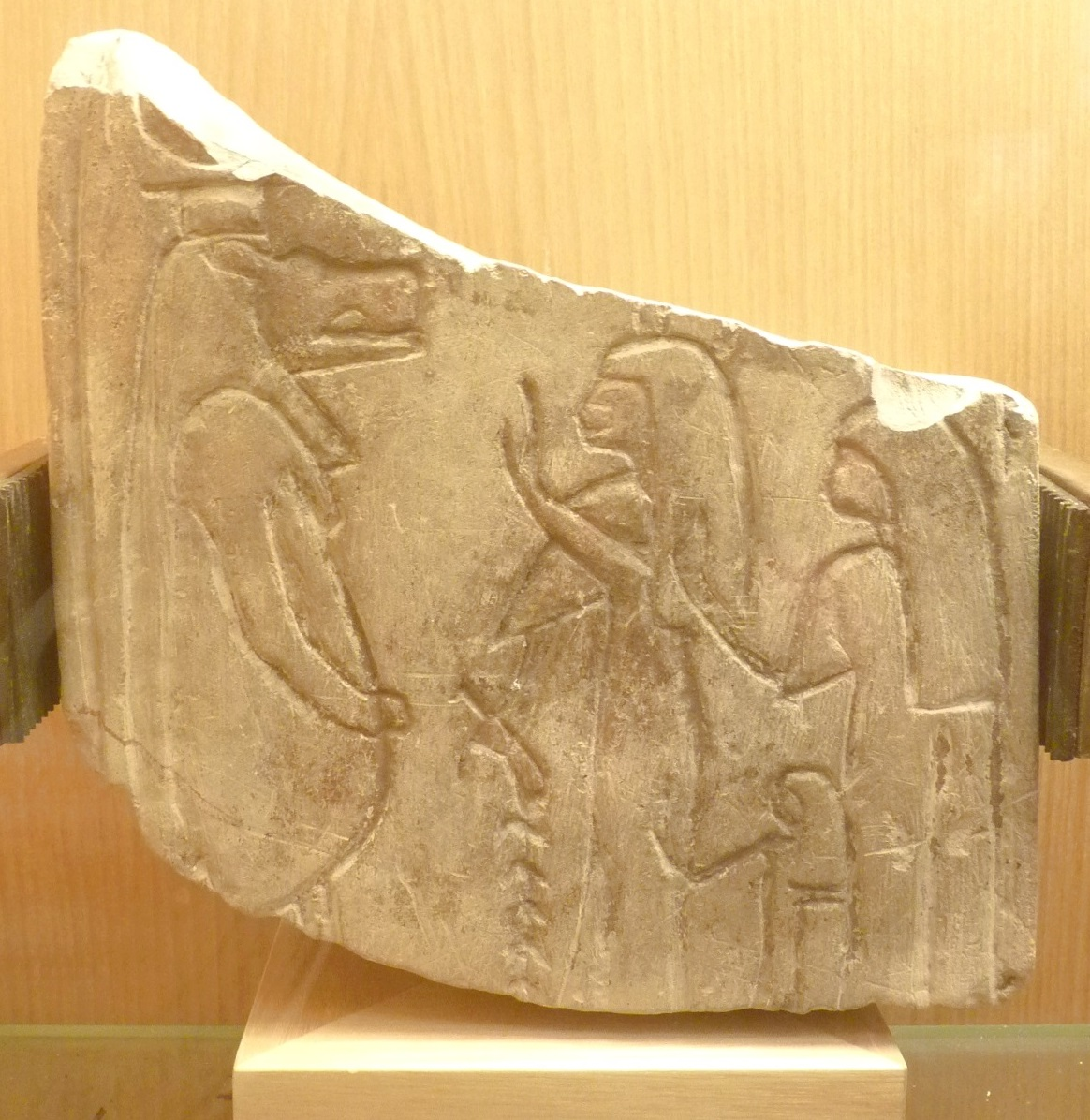
Limestone fragment of a stele depicting two people (right) worshipping Taweret, (19th-20th dynasty, New Kingdom).

Taweret bears physical aspects of both a fertility goddess and a fearsome protective deity. She takes the form of a female hippopotamus, a highly deadly creature. She is also often seen with features from other predatory creatures, most notably being the tail of a Nile crocodile and the paws of a lioness. These features directly parallel those of other ferocious protective ancient Egyptian deities, most notably the crocodile god Sobek and the lioness goddess Sekhmet. These violent theriomorphic deities take on some of the aspects of the animals that they represent – both to the benefit and detriment of humans. Taweret's predatory form allows her to ward away evil from the innocent. Likewise, Taweret's nurturing aspects are also reinforced in her iconography, as she frequently is shown with a pregnant belly, and pendulous human breasts. These breasts are shared by the god of the Nile inundation, Hapi, and signify regenerative powers. Taweret's riverine form allows her to participate in that which annually revives the Nile Valley: the inundation personified by Hapi. It is partly due to her role in this event that may share this iconographic feature with Hapi. She frequently is seen holding the sa hieroglyphic sign (Gardiner V17), which literally means "protection".

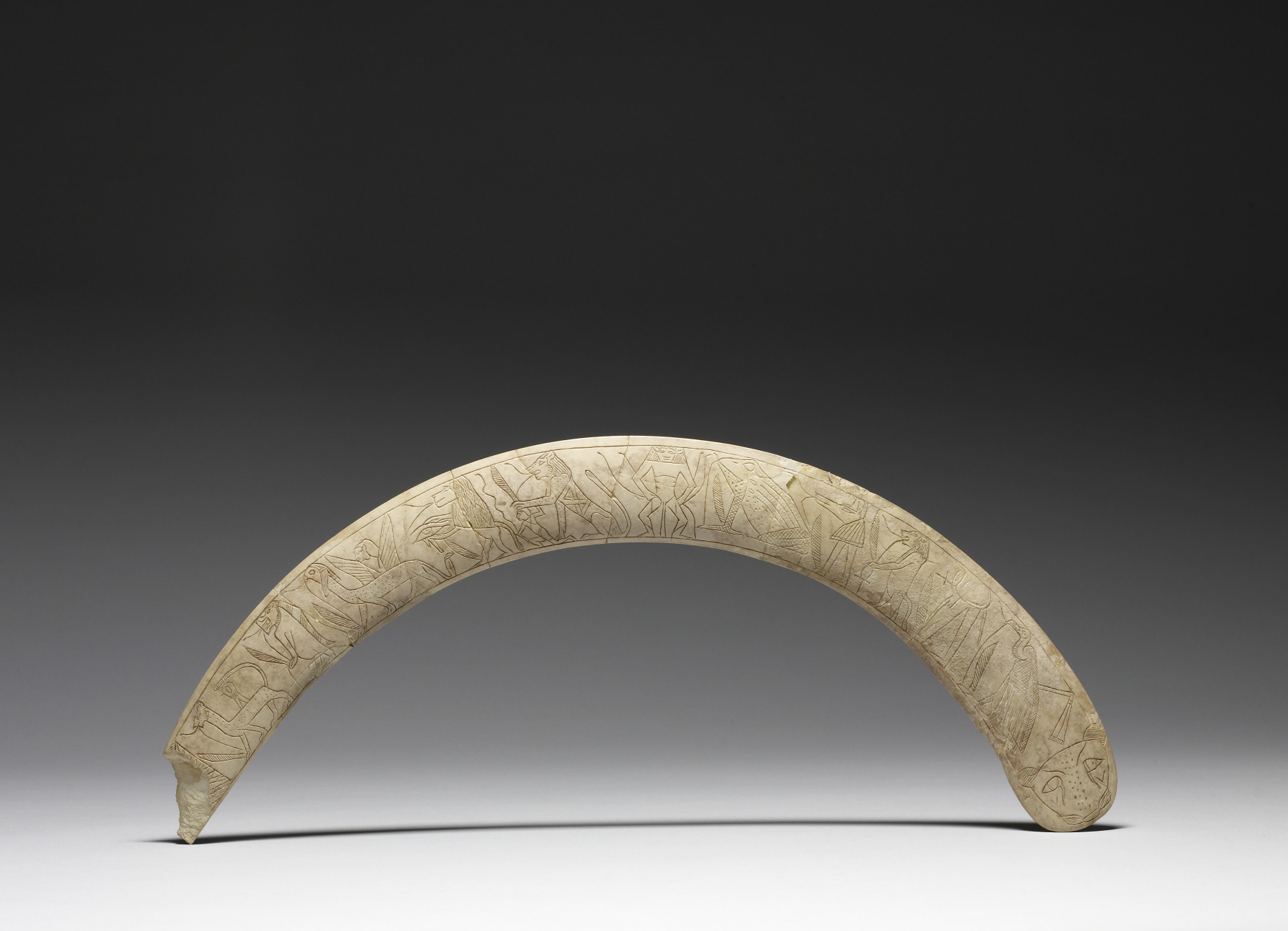
This apotropaic wand (c. 1880 to 1700 BCE) shows a procession of protective deities, including a hippopotamus goddess. Such a wand would have been used in rituals associated with birth and were perhaps used to draw a magical circle around the mother and child. Walters Art Museum, Baltimore.

Faience Amulet of Taweret from the late period of Ancient Egypt. Egyptian Museum (Turin, Italy)

Taweret's image served a functional purpose on a variety of objects. The most notable of these objects are amulets, which protected mothers and children from harm. Such amulets, appearing before 3000 BCE, were popular for most of ancient Egyptian history. She also consistently appeared on household furniture throughout history, including chairs, stools, and headrests. Apotropaic objects became popular in the Middle Kingdom (c. 2055–1650 BCE) and are thought to have been used in rituals related to pregnancy and birth. As is aforementioned, ivory wands and knives showing long processions of deities became widely used in this period. These objects have been shown on tomb paintings in the hands of nurses and wear patterns on the tips indicate that these nurses likely used them to draw protective patterns in the sand. Taweret is featured on almost all known wands, as her powers were invoked particularly to protect children and their mothers. The other deities are almost exclusively deities that accompany the mature sun god in his nightly journey through the dangerous Amduat (underworld). Taweret's inclusion among this company suggests a protective solar role. This is supported by later Ptolemaic (c. 332–30 BCE) conceptions of the goddess, which state that she reared – and in some traditions, birthed – the young sun god (cf. Metternich Stela).

Ritual objects bearing Taweret's image were popular in Egyptian households for the remainder of Egyptian history. Vessels bearing Taweret's shape became popular in the New Kingdom (c. 1550–1069 BCE). These vessels presumably purified the liquid that was poured from it, as Taweret was considered to be "She of the Pure Water". Often these vessels had openings through the nipples, emphasizing Taweret's maternal aspects.

== See also ==
- Ipy (goddess)
