= Ipy (goddess) =

Ancient Egyptian goddess

Name in hieroglyphs
i p t t B1
- Major cult center: Thebes

Genealogy
- Children: Osiris (some accounts)

Ipy is an ancient Egyptian goddess of fertility. She is also known as Opet. At Karnak she is called Ipet, and in the Demotic Magical Papyrus, she is called Apet, the mother of fire.

She is depicted as a hippopotamus. She is sometimes depicted as a combination of a hippo, crocodile, human, and lion. Usually she is depicted with a lion's head, hippo's body, human arms, and lion feet.

She was also seen as a protector of the pharaoh and invoked as mother. In Theban theology she is the mother of Osiris.

She is possibly a forerunner of Taweret.
