= Bes =

Ancient Egyptian deity of households

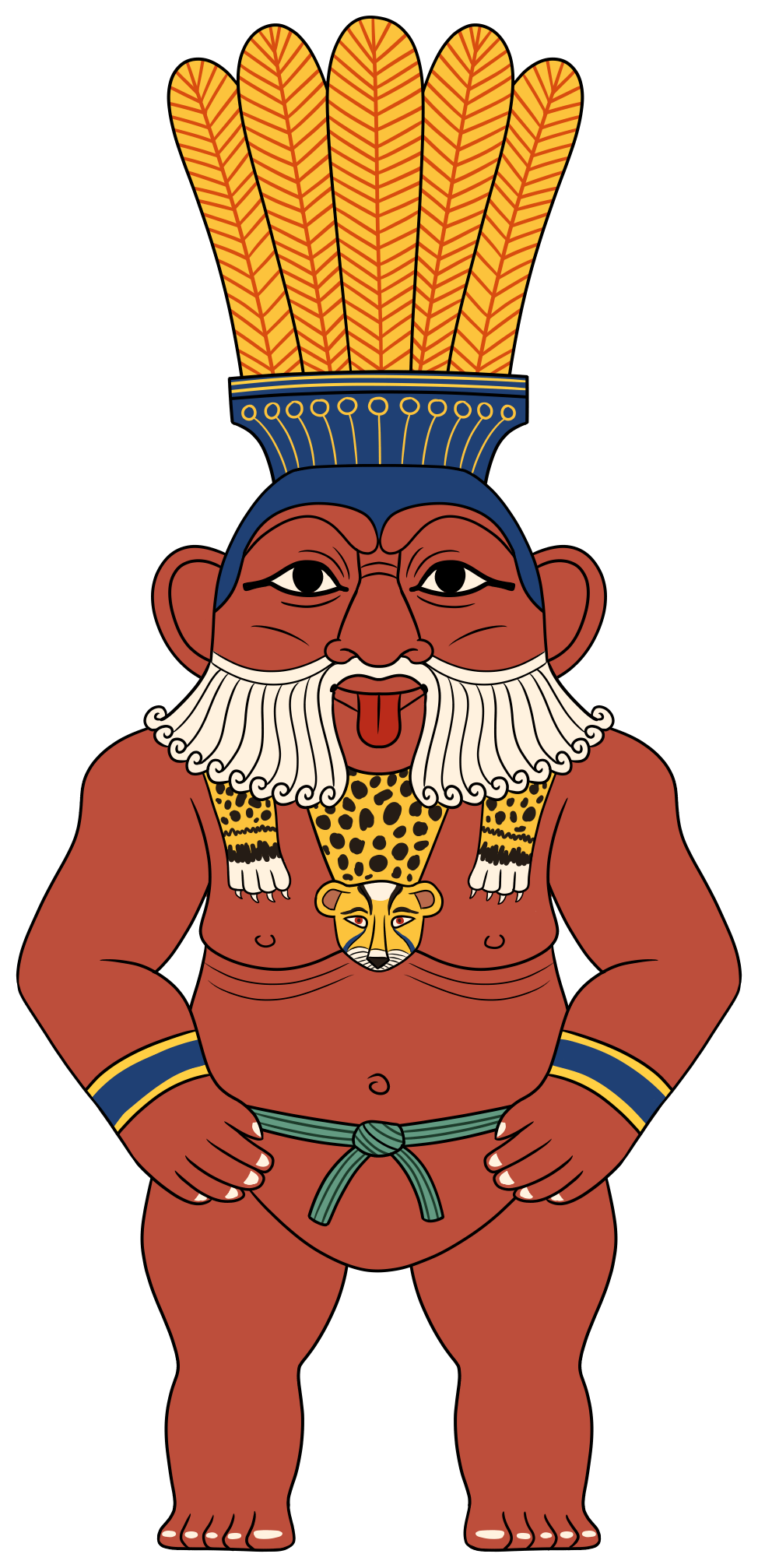
- A depiction of Bes based on various sources
Name in hieroglyphs
D58 S29 F28
- Major cult center: Hermopolis, but worshipped everywhere
- Symbol: Ostrich feather

Genealogy
- Parents: Min (god) (in some myths)
- Siblings: Taweret
- Consort: Beset, Taweret

Bes (/ˈbɛs/; also spelled as Bisu, Coptic: Ⲃⲏⲥ, Ⲃⲏⲥⲁ, Arabic: ويصا, romanized: Wīssa), together with his feminine counterpart Beset, is an ancient Egyptian deity, of Nubian or C-Group culture origin worshipped as a protector of households and, in particular, of mothers, children, and childbirth. Bes later came to be regarded as the defender of everything good and the enemy of all that is bad. According to Donald Mackenzie in 1907, Bes may have been a Middle Kingdom import from Nubia and his cult did not become widespread until the beginning of the New Kingdom, but more recently several Bes-like figurines have been found in deposits from the Naqada period of pre-dynastic Egypt, like the thirteen figurines found at Tell el-Farkha.

Worship of Bes spread as far north as the area of Syria and as far west as the Balearic Islands (Ibiza) in Spain, and later into the Roman and Achaemenid Empires.

== Origin ==
Beset
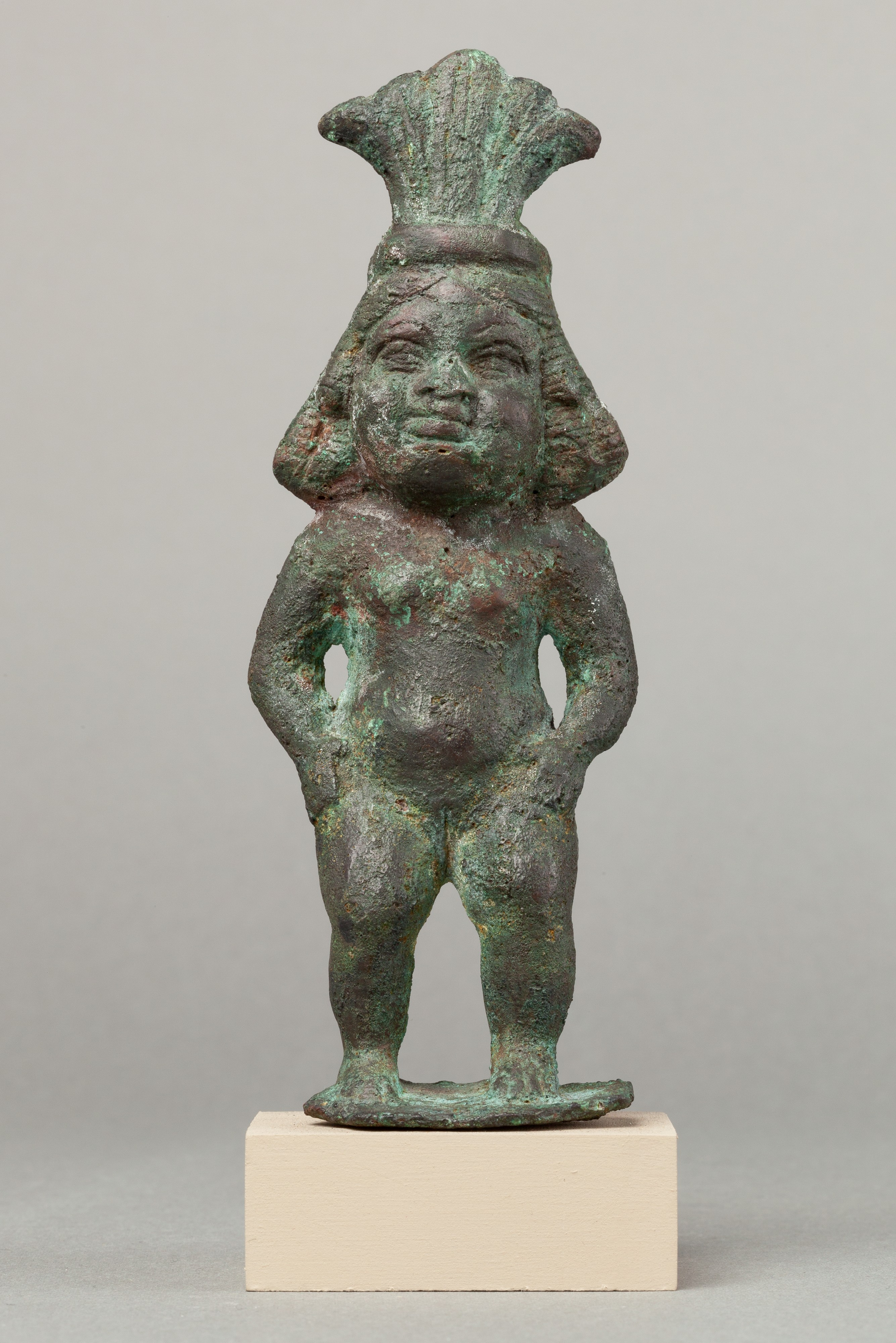
- A Statuette of Beset
- Symbol: Ostrich feather
- Consort: Bes

People in Upper Egypt started venerating Bes long before people in Lower Egypt, indicating a Nubian origin. The word “bes” means “cat” in Nubian, suggesting a possible Nubian or southern origin of Bes, the god having regularly been depicted with feline features. Bes's Sub-saharan features also indicate a Kushite or C group origin, as well as the late introduction into Egypt during the Middle Kingdom, The feathered crown was also a common item of dress in ancient Kush that Bes is commonly depicted with. It is also possible that the name Bes (or Bas) originated from one of two hieroglyphs: "bs", meaning "flame", possibly in connection to Re, and/or "bz", meaning "to be initiated" or "to introduce" possibly in reference to masks apparently used in the cult of the god.

Bes is first mentioned in the Pyramid Texts, but seems to have been best known and most widely worshiped in the Middle Kingdom. Evidence of Bes worship in at least some form exists into Coptic Egypt, with the latest evidence being a jug depicting Bes found in Tell Edfu dating to the 10th century CE.

== Worship ==
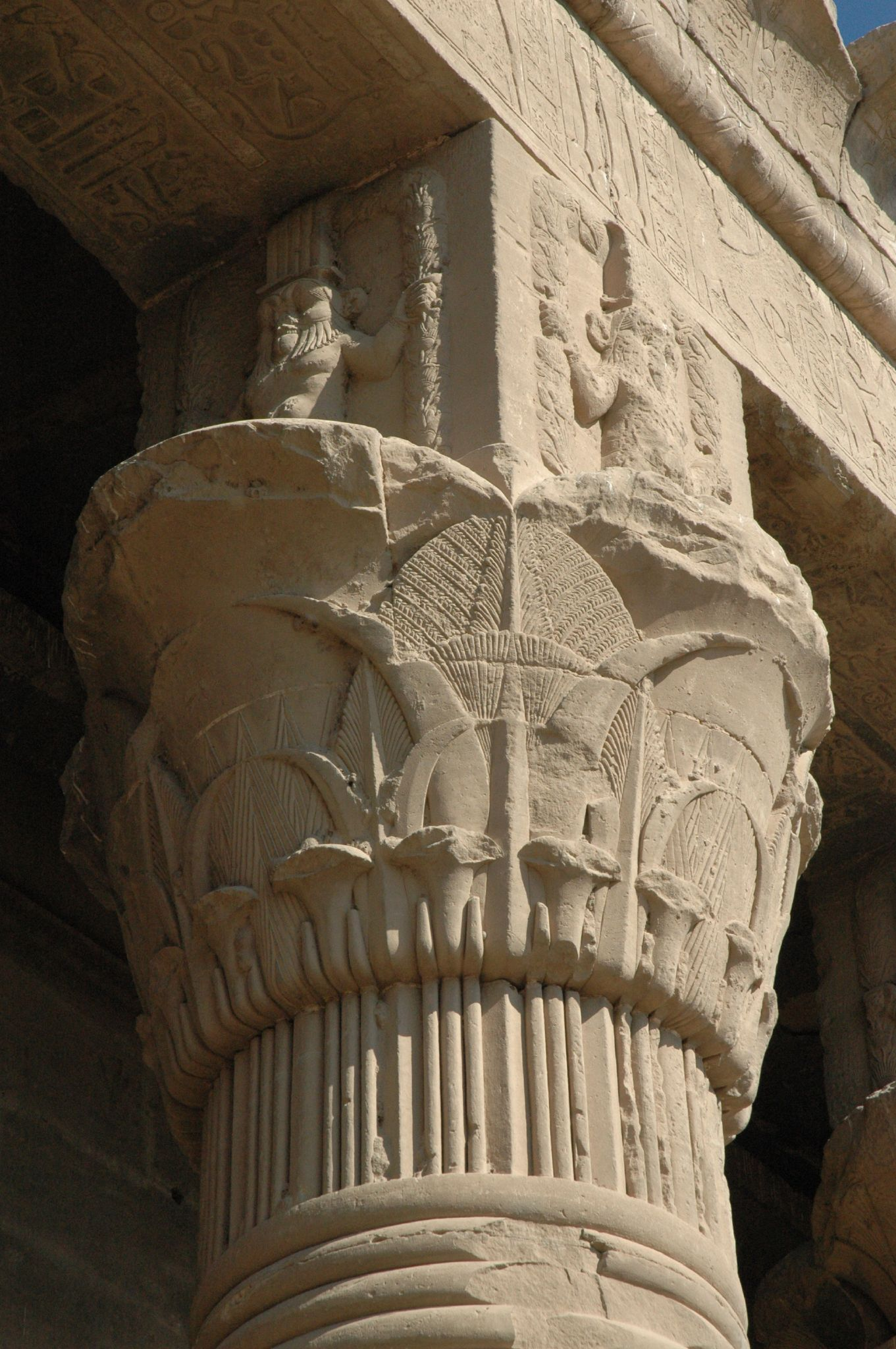
Egyptian composite capital with a Bes capital above it, in the Dendera Temple complex (Egypt)

Bes was a household protector, becoming responsible– throughout ancient Egyptian history– for such varied tasks as killing snakes, fighting off evil spirits, watching after children, and aiding women in labour by fighting off evil spirits, and thus present with Taweret at births.

Images of the deity, quite different from those of the other gods, were kept in homes. Normally Egyptian gods were shown in profile, but instead Bes appeared in full face portrait, ithyphallic, and sometimes in a soldier's tunic, so as to appear ready to launch an attack on any approaching evil. He scared away demons from houses, so his statue was put up as a protector. Since he drove off evil, Bes also came to symbolize the good things in life– music, dance, and sexual pleasure. In the Middle Kingdom, Bes is depicted on a variety of objects, including masks, amulets, infant feeding bottles, and magic knives. In the New Kingdom, tattoos of Bes could be found on the thighs of dancers, musicians and servant girls.

Later, in the Ptolemaic period of Egyptian history, chambers were constructed at Saqqara, painted with images of Bes and his female counterpart Beset, thought by Egyptologists to have been for the purpose of curing fertility problems or general healing rituals.

Like many Egyptian gods, the worship of Bes or Beset was exported overseas. While the female variant had been more popular in Minoan Crete, the male version would prove popular with the Phoenicians and the ancient Cypriots.

At the end of the 6th century BC, images of Bes began to spread across the Achaemenid Empire, which Egypt belonged to at the time. Images of Bes have been found at the Persian capital of Susa, and as far away as central Asia. Over time, the image of Bes became more Persian in style, as he was depicted wearing Persian clothes and headdress.

== Iconography ==
=== Figurines ===
Modern scholars such as James Romano - Egyptologist and former Curator of Egyptian Art at the Brooklyn Museum - claim that in its earliest inception Bes was a representation of a lion rearing up on its hind legs. After the Third Intermediate Period, Bes can be found on a variety of household objects including furniture, toiletries, infant feeding bottles, game pieces, and more beginning in the Middle Kingdom.

=== Tattoos ===
As mentioned above, Bes is also seen depicted in tattoos. Wall art from the 19th Dynasty found at the workman's village of Deir El-Medina depicts a tattoo of a dancing Bes on the thigh of a female musician playing her instrument.

=== Jugs ===
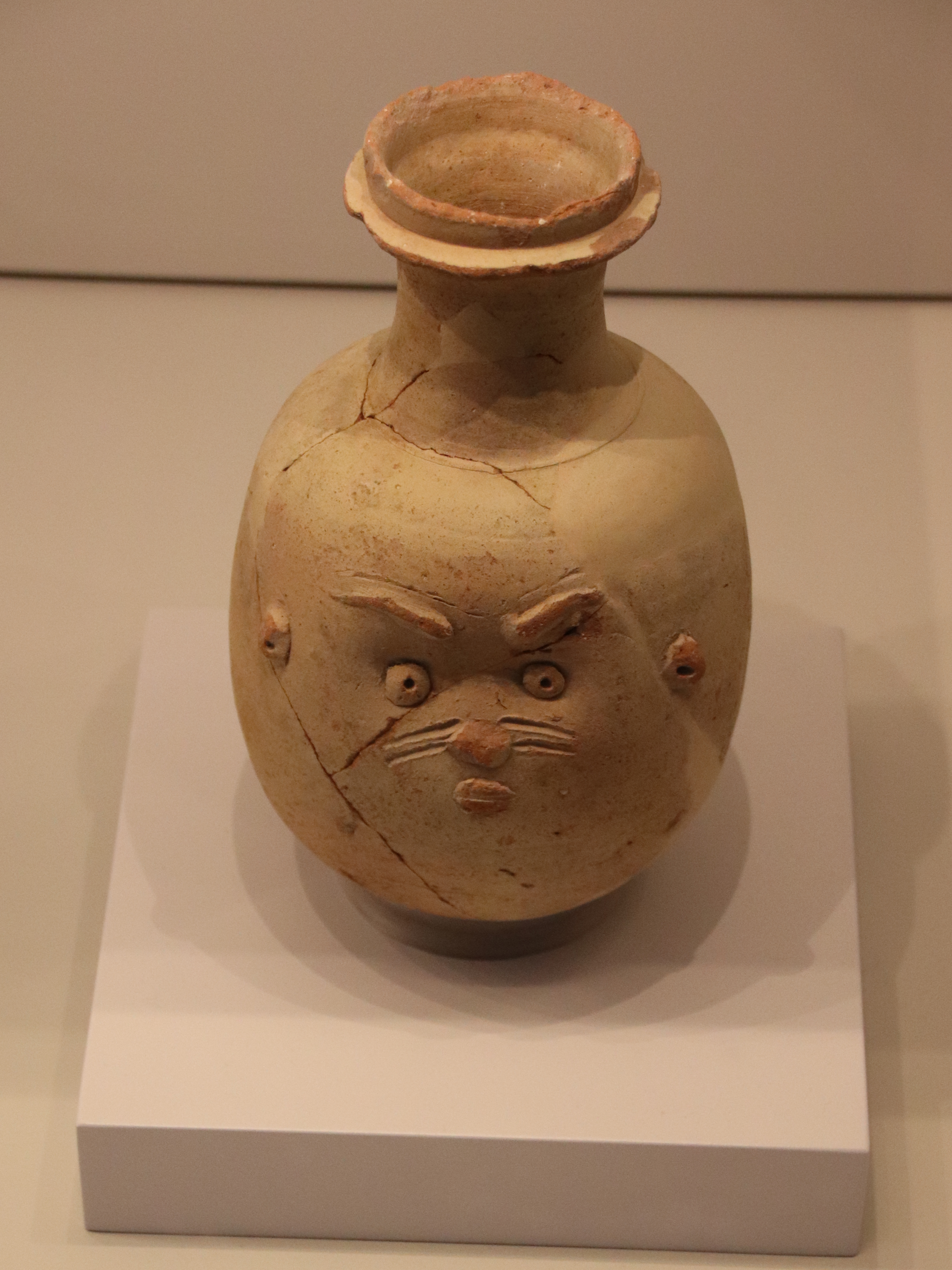
Pottery Jug Depicting Bes, 5th Century BCE

Jugs, vases, and other storage containers represent the majority of pottery containing Bes iconography. The depiction of an anthropomorphic head on jugs is a style predominately found in West Asian pottery, suggesting that there may be influence from the Syro-Palestinian region. Further supporting the possibility of West Asian influence is tomb 1300 of the Mayana cemetery near Sedment dating from the Second Intermediate Period that contains both vases depicting Bes and five small faience jugs almost certainly of Palestinian origin. This, along with other objects likely of West Asian origin indicates that the occupant likely maintained contact with Palestine, and as such the West Asian style Bes jug may have been manufactured there.

Painted storage jars depicting Bes have also been found in the site of Amarna dating to the late 18th Dynasty, in addition to a multitude of jars found in Deir el-Medina. In addition to these jars as well as aforementioned depictions on bedroom paraphernalia, faience baby bottles have been found in el-Lisht, further showing Bes as a protector of children.

Traces of Peganum harmala, and Nimphaea nouchali var. caerulea were identified in an Egyptian ritual Bes-vase, of the 2nd century BCE.

== Popular culture ==
- Bes appears, as part of the delegation of Egyptian gods, in The Sandman: Season of Mists (December 1990 – July 1991), by Neil Gaiman.
- Bes appears as a trickster in Mummies Alive! (1997) animated series.
- Bes appears as a character in Mountain of Black Glass (1999) by Tad Williams. His physical description reflects traditional iconography.
- Bes is a friend and helper to the heroes in Pyramid Scheme (2001) by Eric Flint and Dave Freer.
- Bes appears, as a god of love in the Egyptian movie Secret Service Suitor (Aris min geha amneya) (2004).
- Bes is an important character in the books of the saga The Kane Chronicles (2010–2012) by Rick Riordan.
- Bes appears in the video game Realm of the Mad God (2011) as a boss of an Egyptian themed dungeon known as the "Tomb of the Ancients," alongside Nut and Geb.
- Bes appears in The Nikopol Trilogy (1980-1992) by Enki Bilal, alongside several of the ancient gods of Egypt, hovering over a dystopian Paris and world.
- Bes also appeared in the Discovery Kids' Tutenstein animated series (2003).

== Gallery ==
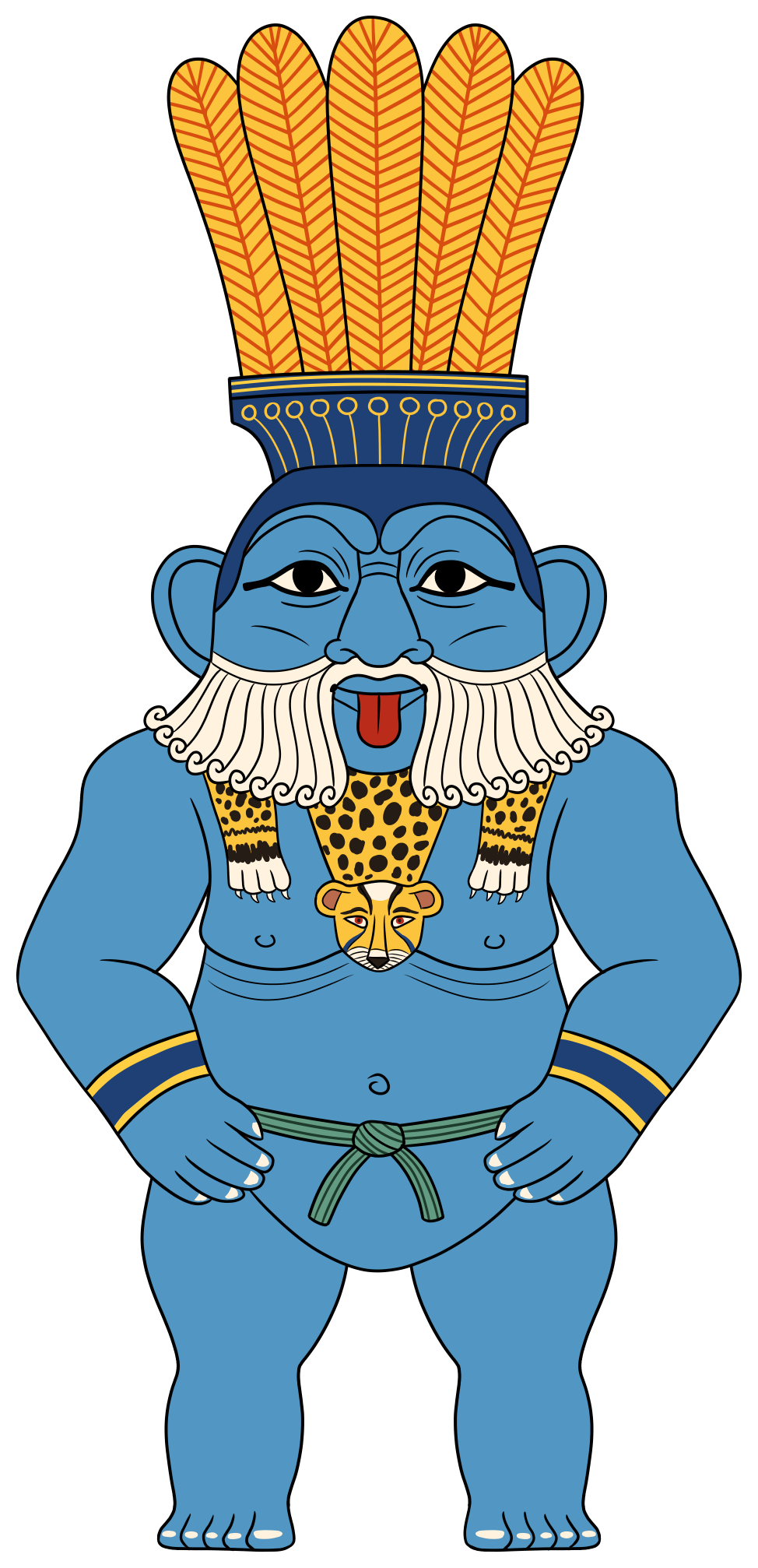
Bes was sometimes depicted with blue skin

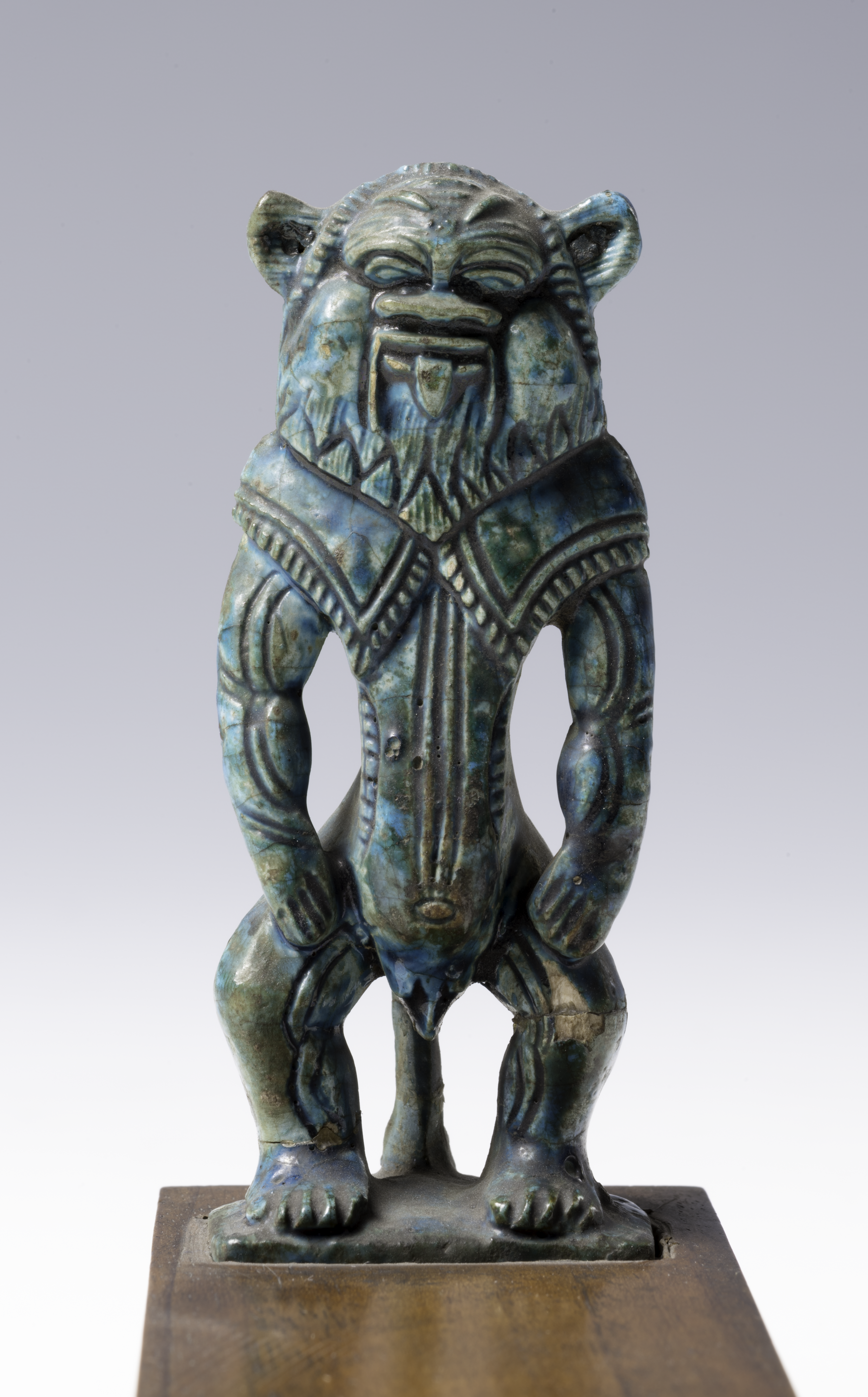
Amulet depicting the god Bes, blue Egyptian faience, between 1540 and 1076 BC, New Kingdom. Museo Egizio, Turin.

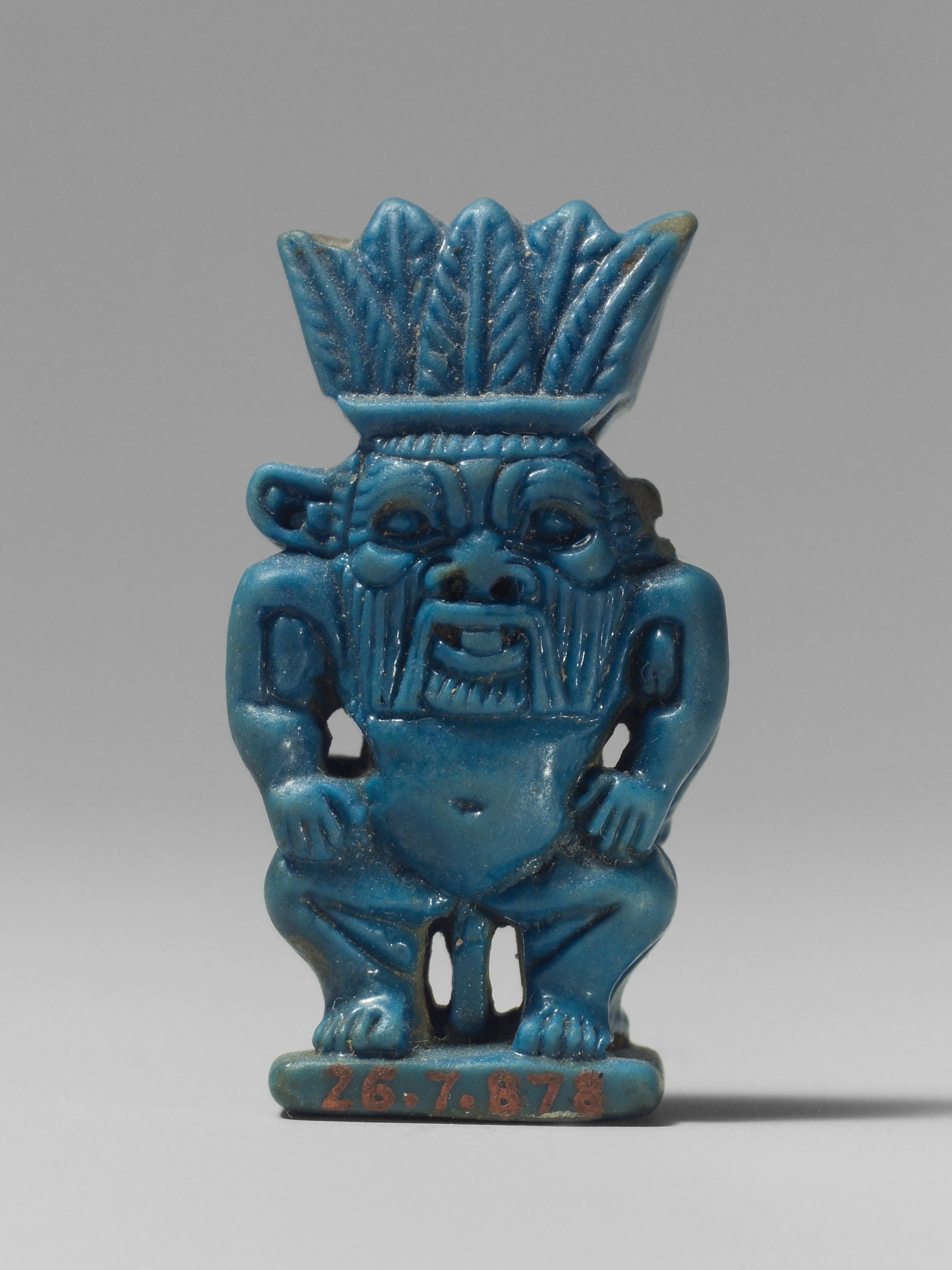
Amulet of Bes; 1070–712 BC; faience; height: 3.7 cm; Metropolitan Museum of Art (New York City)

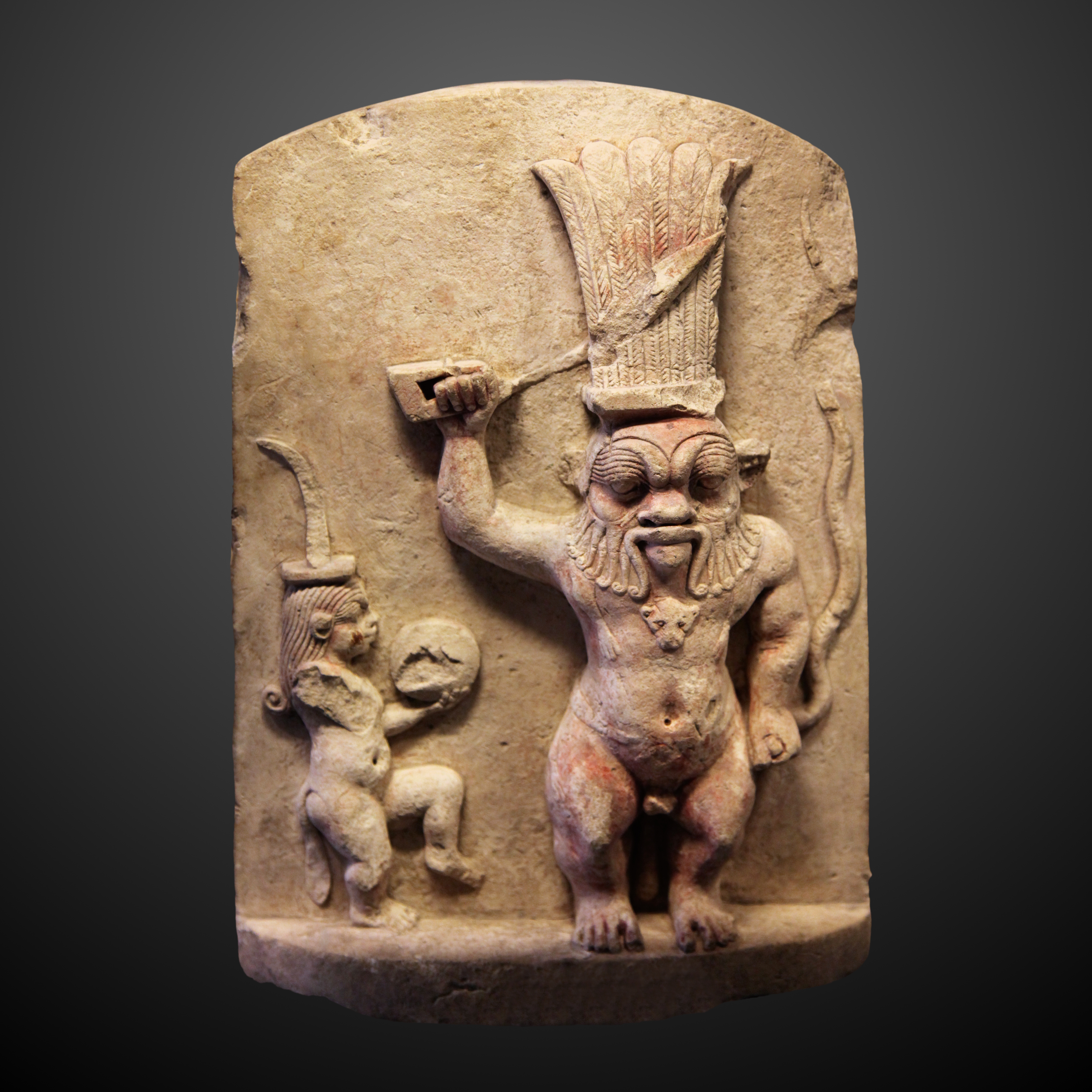
Bes and Beset; 664–332 BC; limestone; height: 31.7 cm, width: 22.5 cm; Louvre

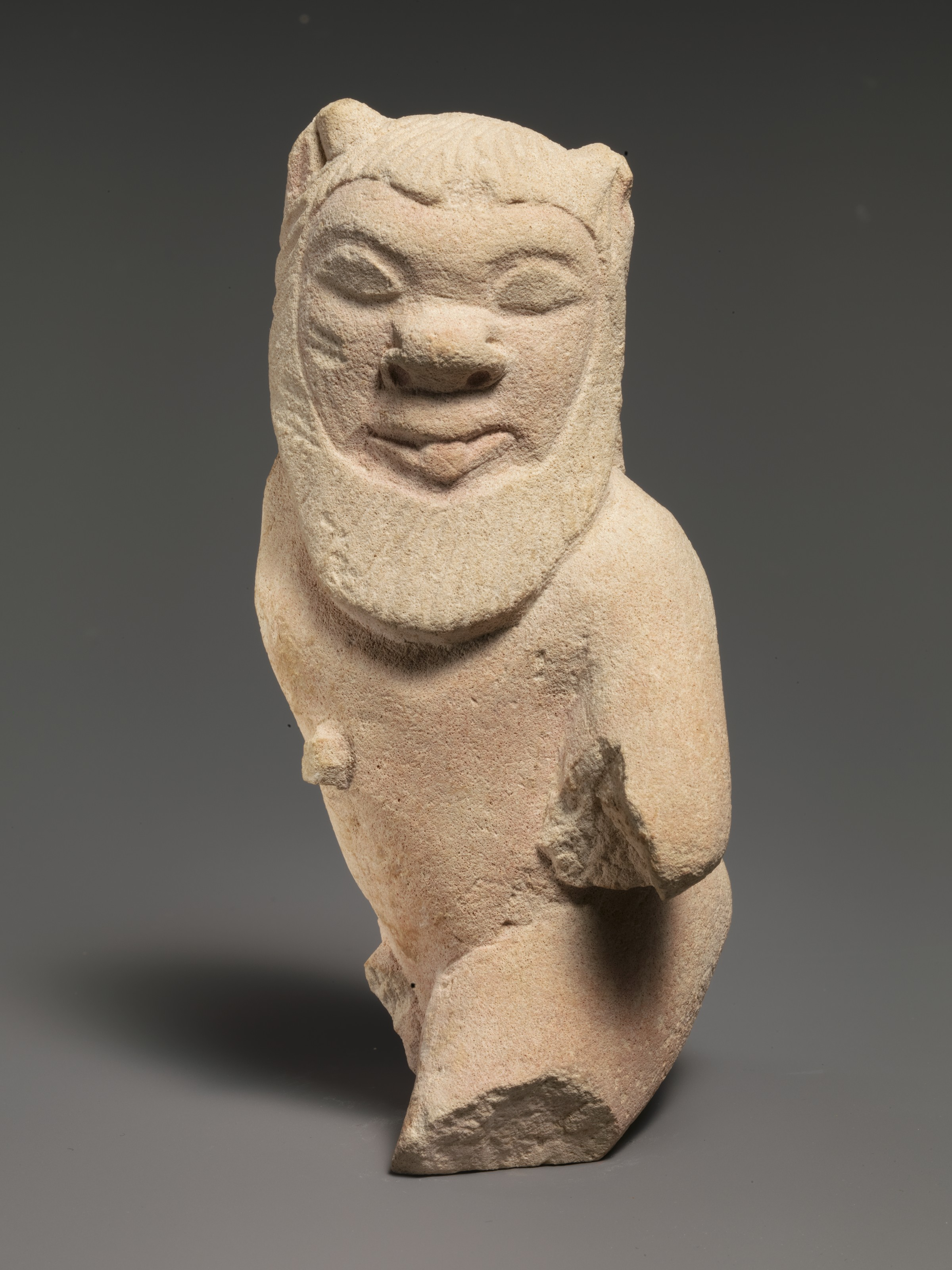
Cypriot statuette of Bes; late 6th – early 5th century BC; limestone; overall: 14 × 8.3 × 7 cm; Metropolitan Museum of Art

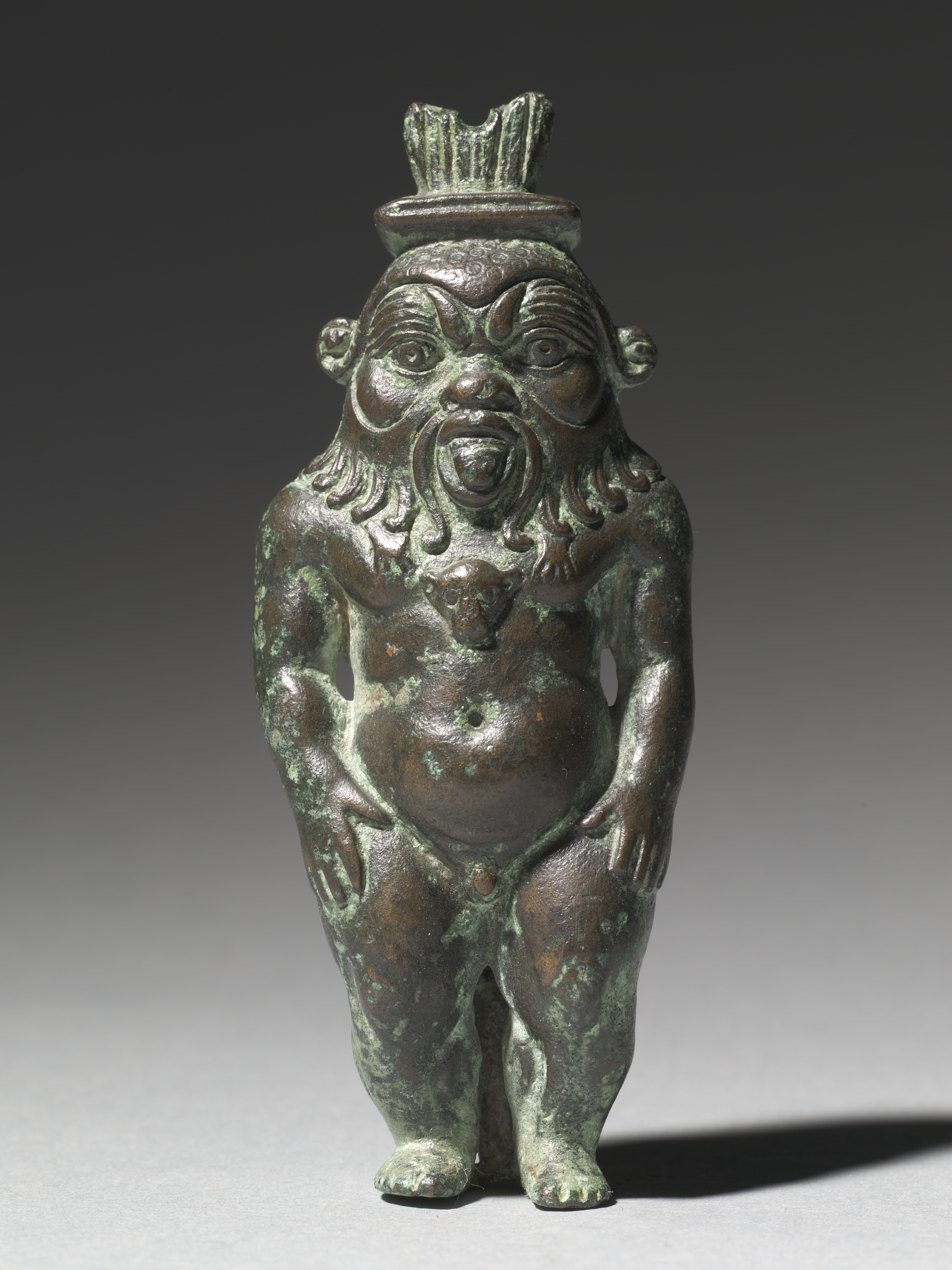
Statuette of Bes; 525 BC; bronze; Late Period, Dynasty 27 or later; overall: 8 × 3.5 × 2.2 cm; Cleveland Museum of Art (Cleveland, Ohio, USA)

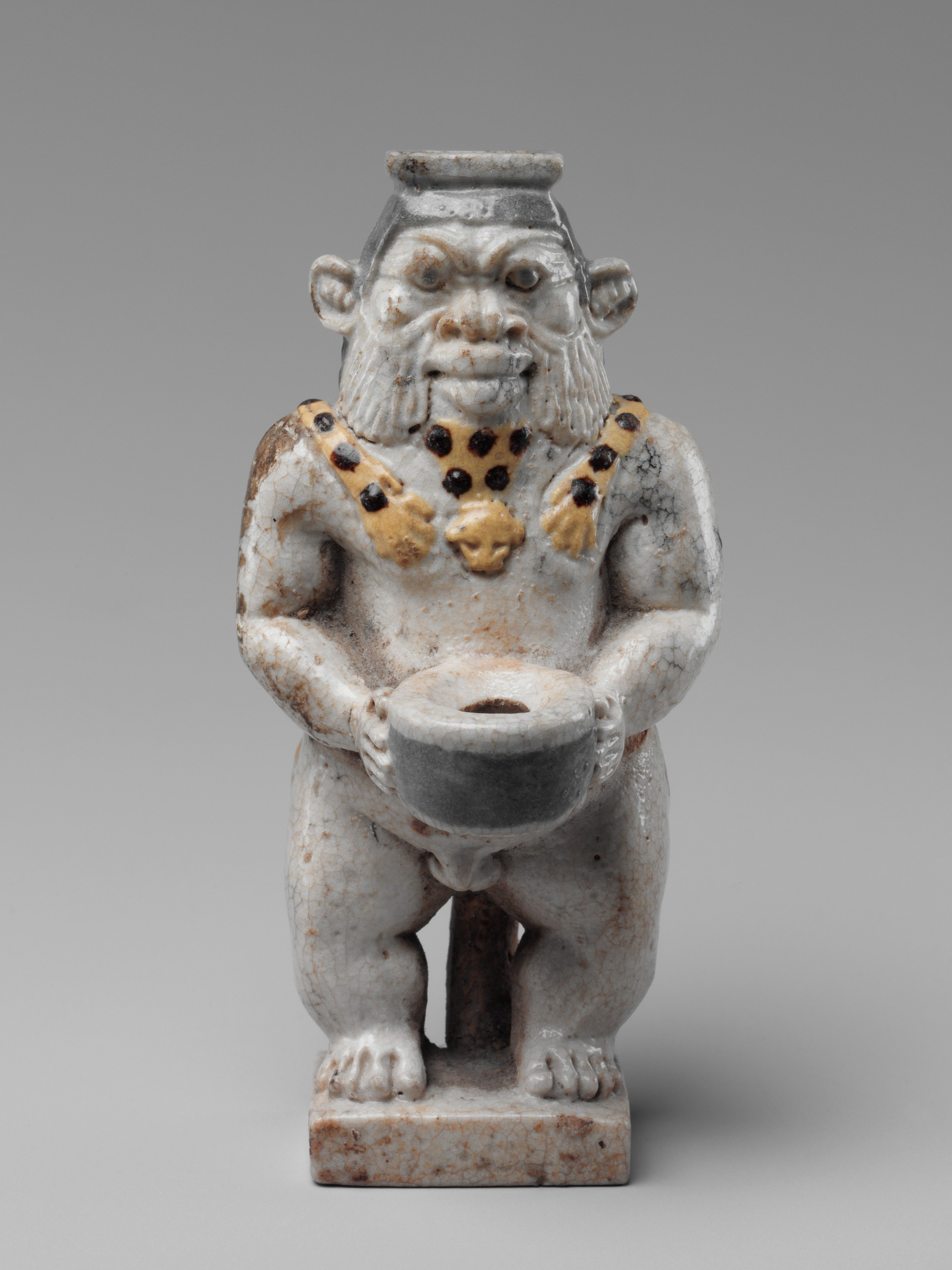
Cosmetic container; 525–404 BC; faience; height: 9.2 cm, width: 4.4 cm; Metropolitan Museum of Art

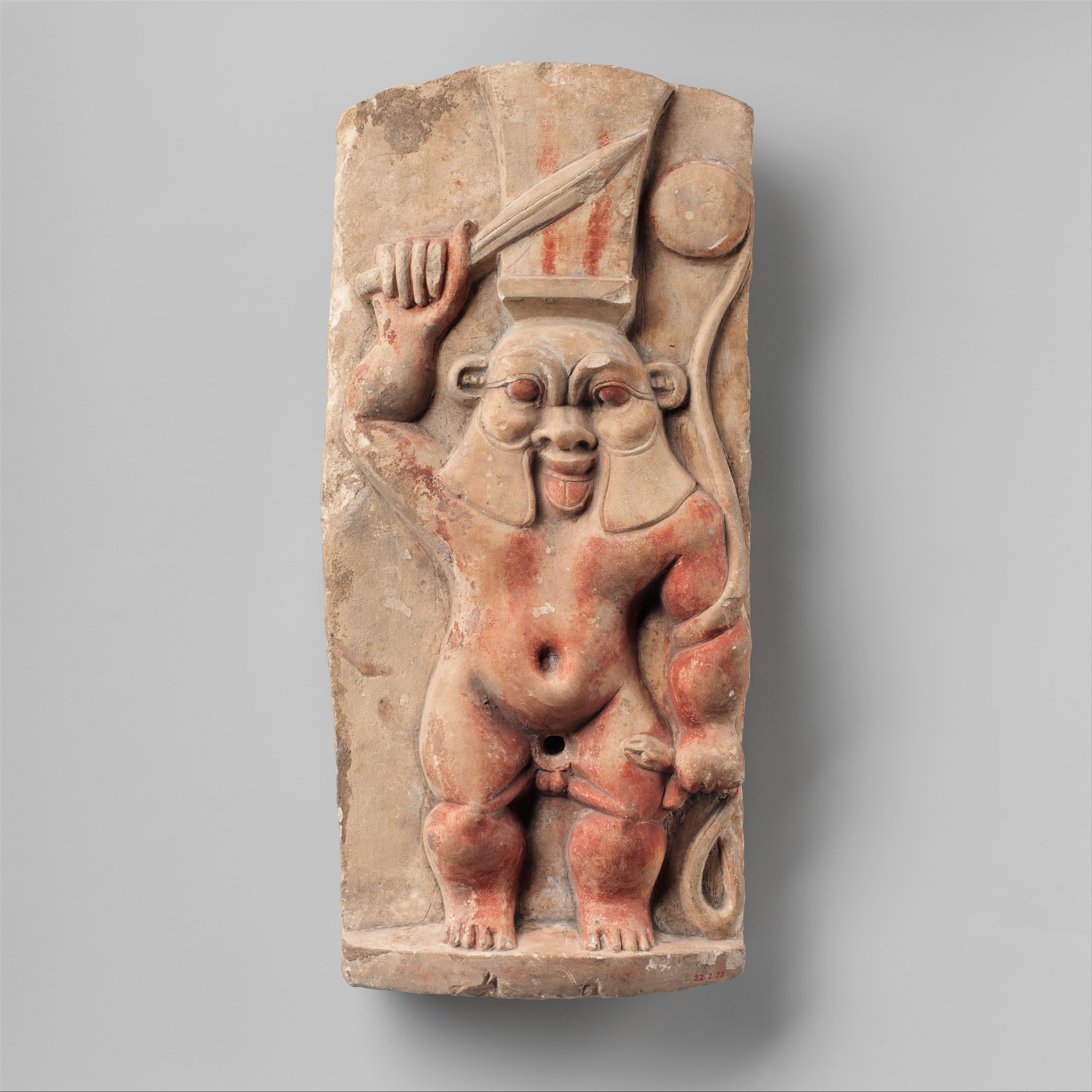
Stela of Bes; 4th century BC-1st century AD; painted limestone; height: 38.7 cm, width: 17.7 cm; Metropolitan Museum of Art

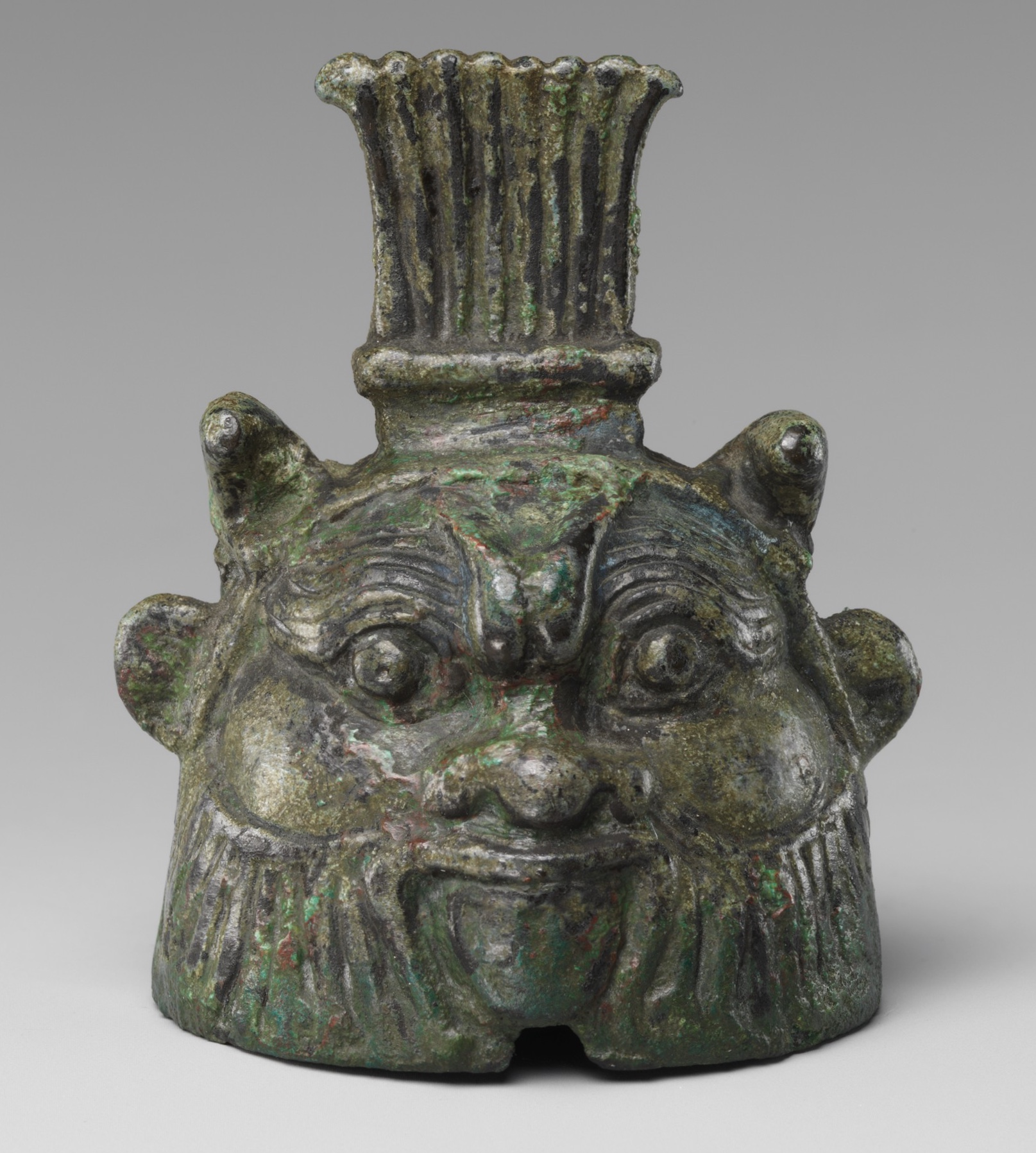
Bell in the form of Bes; 332-30 BC; cupreous metal; height: 6.3 cm, diameter: 4.6 cm; Metropolitan Museum of Art

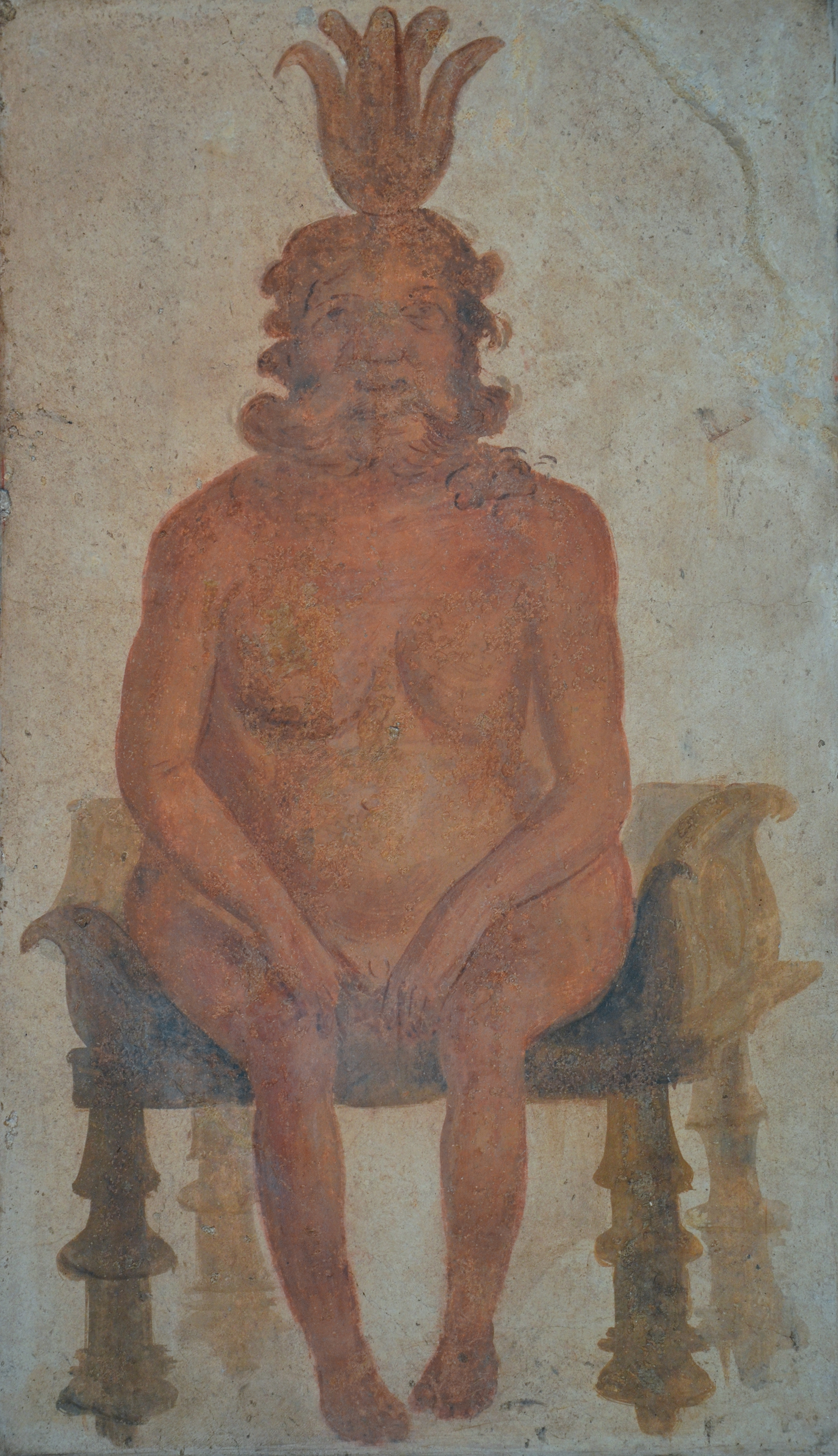
Fresco from the Temple of Isis in Pompeii depicting Bes, in the Naples National Archaeological Museum (Italy)

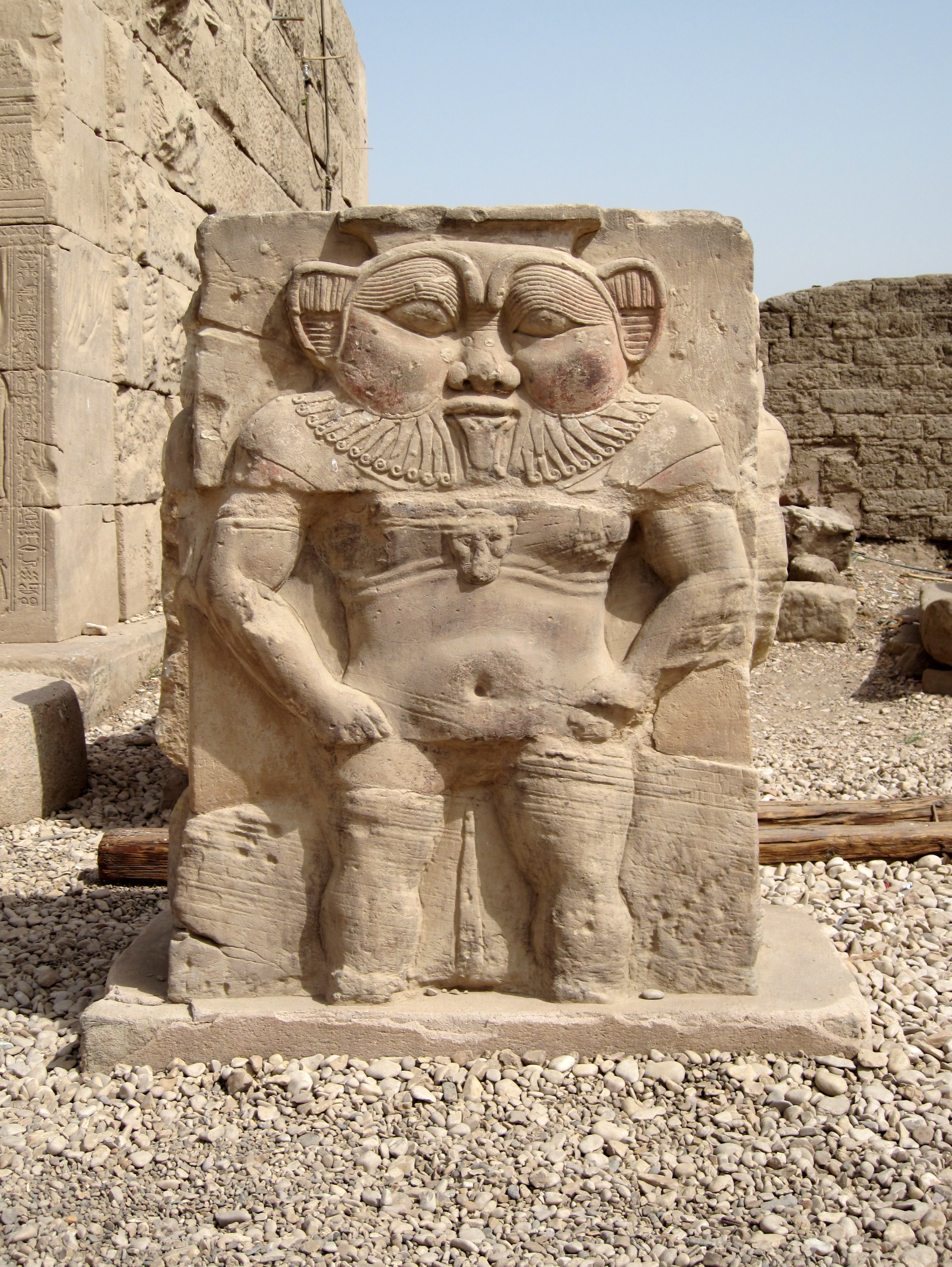
Bes as depicted on a column capital from the Dendera Temple complex, Roman Period

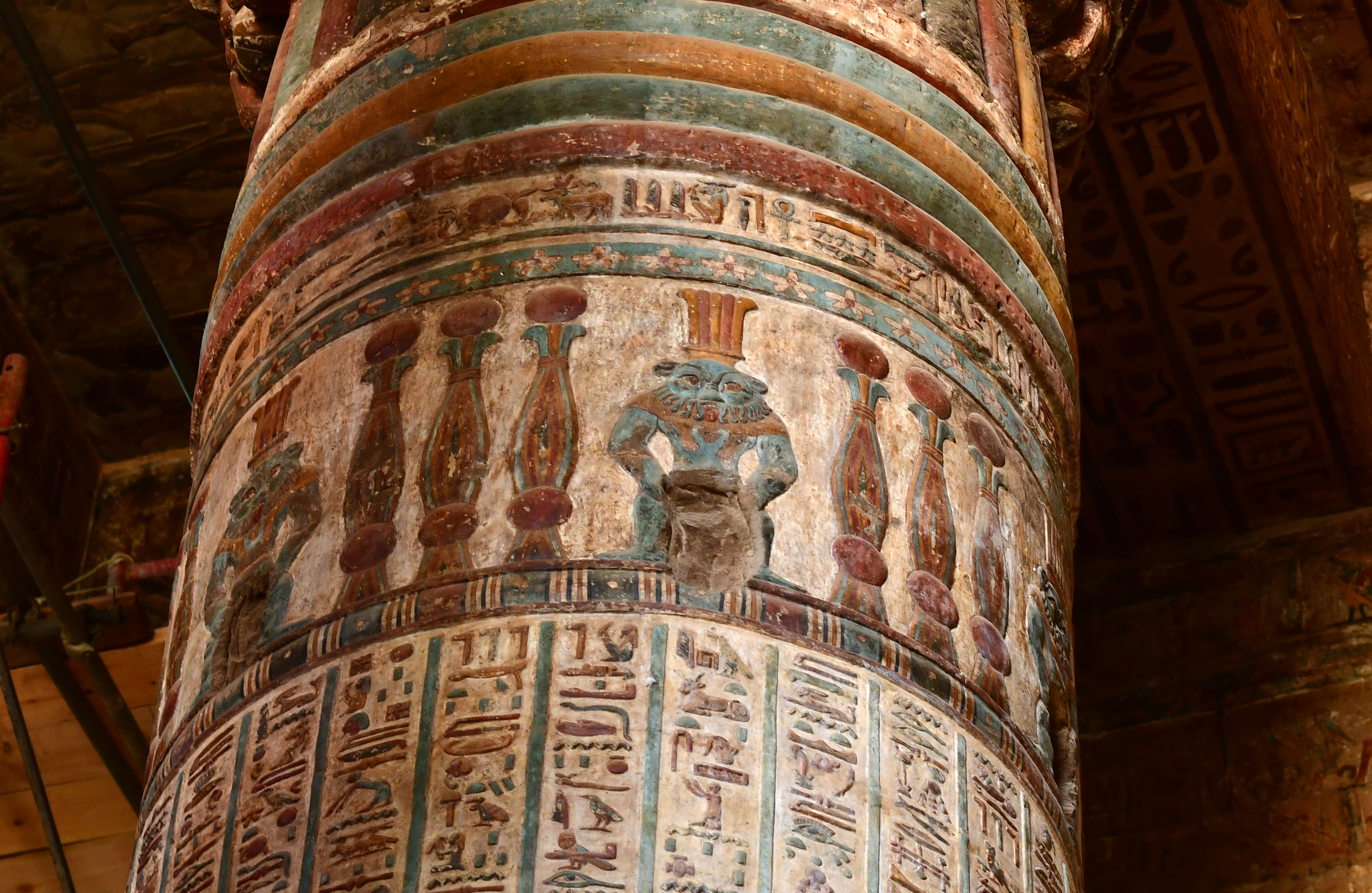
Bes depicted on a column at the temple of Esna

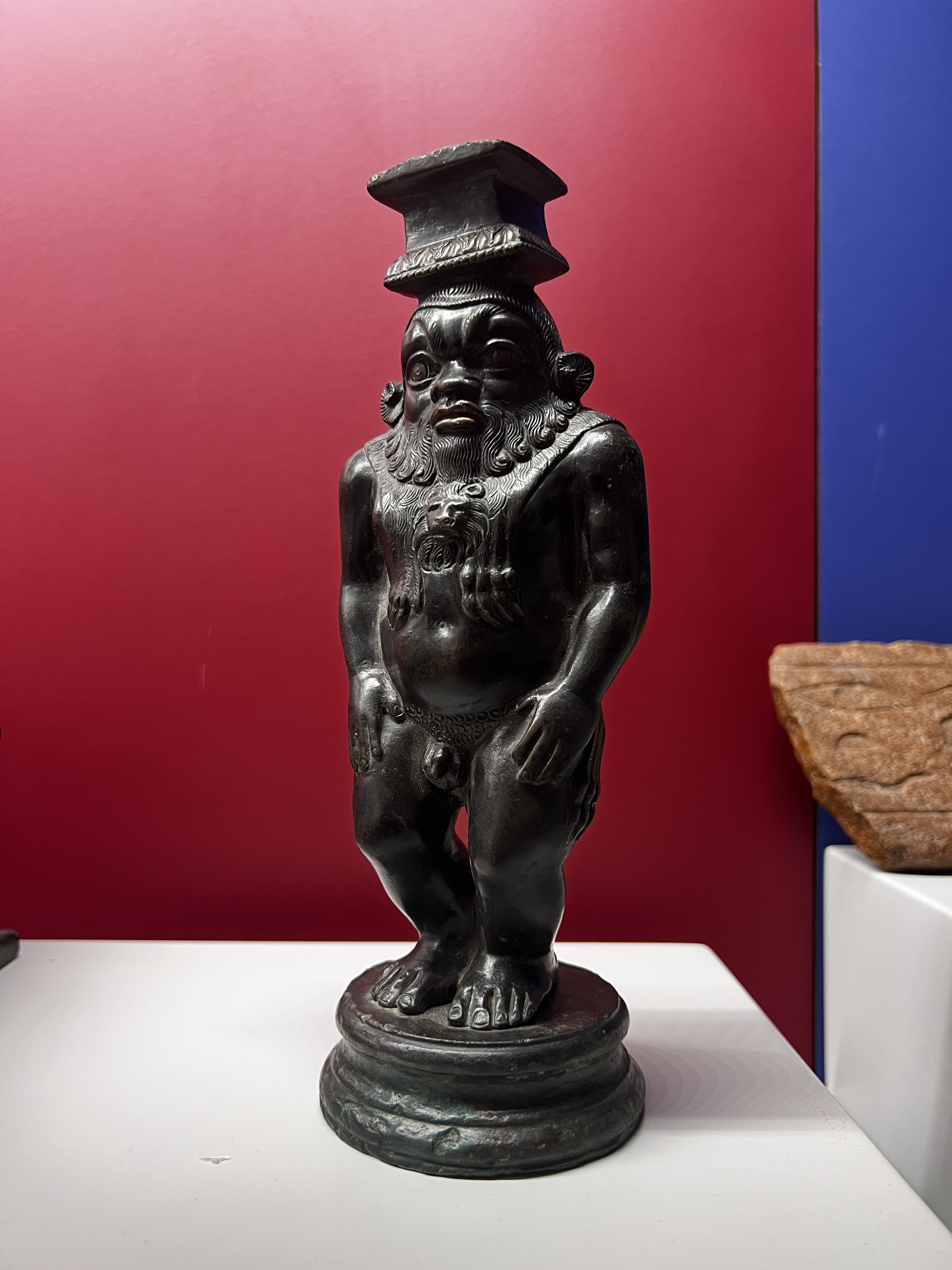
At the Naples Archaeological Museum

== Bibliography ==
- The Complete Gods and Goddesses of Ancient Egypt, Richard H. Wilkinson. ISBN 0-500-05120-8
- The Oxford History of Ancient Egypt, Ian Shaw. ISBN 0192804588
