= Beccut cippus =

Cippus in Tunisia

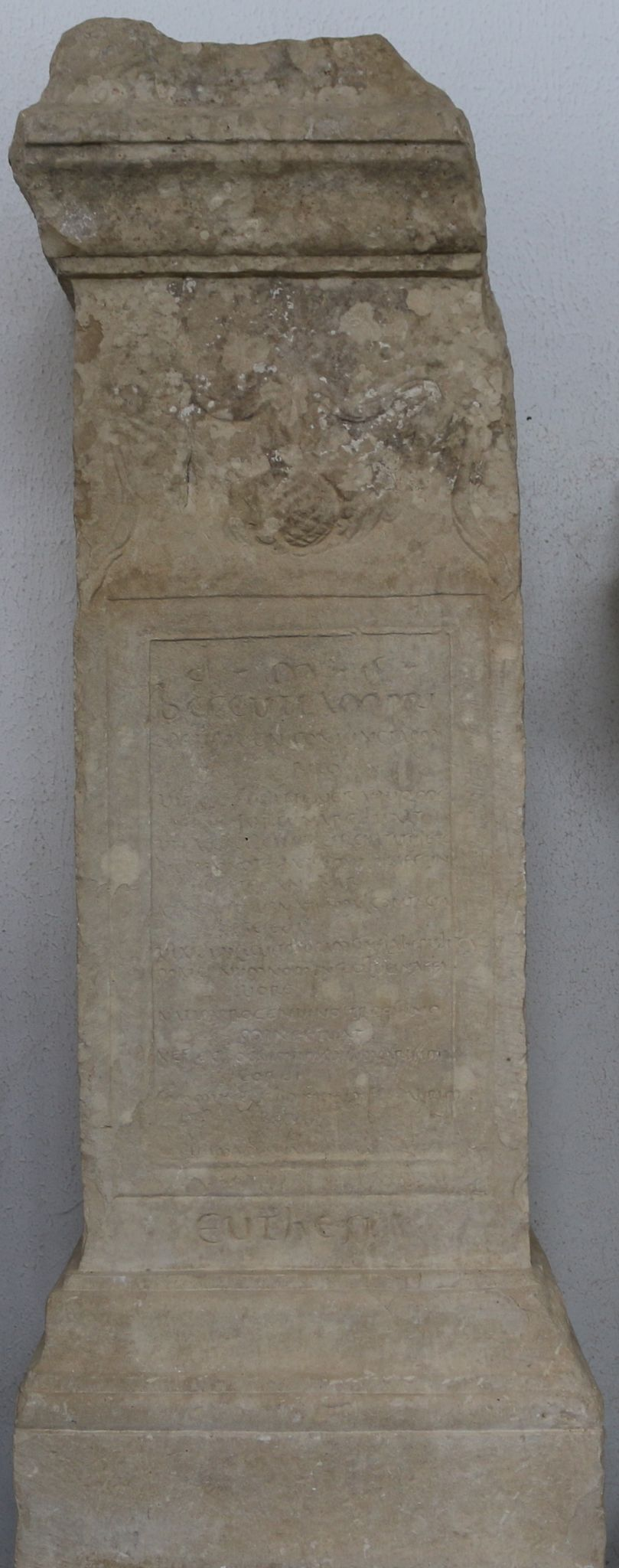
- Lapidary item in the Makthar Museum: the stone known as the Beccut cippus.
- Type: Cippus
- Material: Limestone
- Discovered: 1953; Carthage archeological site
- Place: Makthar Museum
- Culture: Roman Africa

The Beccut cippus is an archaeological artifact found in 1953 in Makthar (Tunisia). It is preserved in the town's archaeological museum, opened in 1967.

Along with the famous Makthar harvester inscription unearthed in the late 19th century and preserved in the Louvre, the cippus is one of the few epigraphic documents found on this site to have been engraved with a poetic text.

This third century text evokes the memory of a deceased young woman. Despite the clumsiness of the wording, written in a provincial context, it provides information on the social and religious life of the town, and is a valuable insight into the Romanization of this part of Roman Africa and the integration of populations of Numidian origin at the end of the High Roman Empire.

== History ==
=== Ancient history of Makthar up to the 3rd century ===
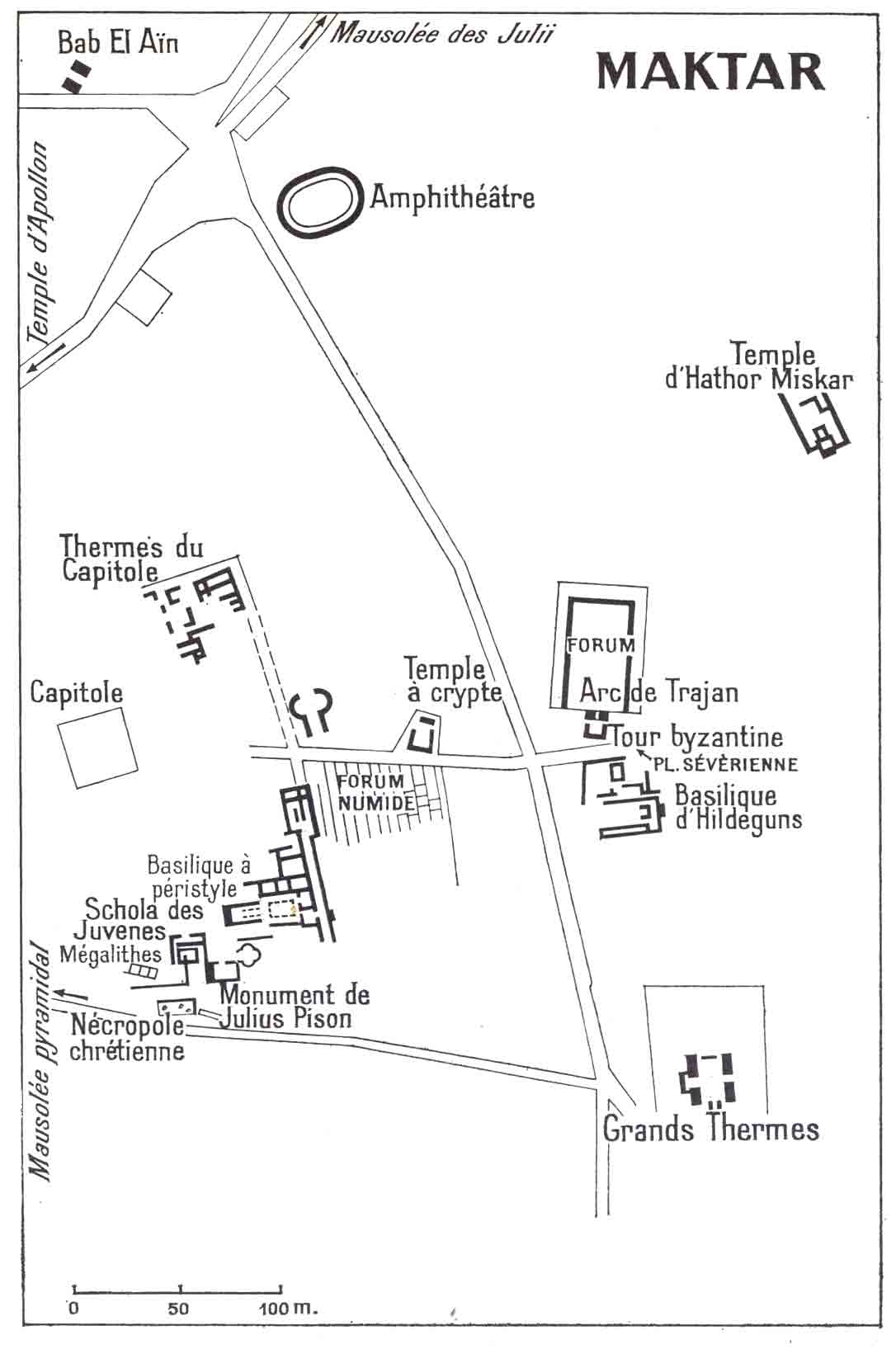
Map of the Makthar archaeological site, essentially inside the current archaeological park. Only partially corresponding to the ancient city.

The Beccut cippus is a funerary monument discovered in Makthar by site supervisor Herranz during the exploration of the Roman road leading from Makthar to Ausafa through the Wadi Saboun valley.

The site of the town of Makthar, occupied in ancient times, was the seat of a powerful Numidian city allied to Carthage, which Masinissa seized shortly before the final fall of the Punic city in 146 BC at the end of the Third Punic War. The influence of Carthaginian civilization remained strong for a long time, as evidenced by the Neo-Punic stelae dating from the 1st century and found in excavations at the site known as Bab El Aïn. From the end of the 1st century, the city benefited from Roman peace and experienced a degree of prosperity. The institutions of the city, which became a free city in 46 BC, were permanently influenced by the Punic era, with the maintenance of three shophets until the beginning of the 2nd century. From that century onwards, triumvirates replaced them.

The Romanization of the city began with some families gaining citizenship from the reign of Trajan, and others the equestrian rank during the reign of Commodus. The old Numidian city had previously become a colony under the name of Colonia Aelia Aurelia Mactaris between 176 and 180. The city's zenith came at the end of the 2nd century, during the reign of Emperor Marcus Aurelius, with intense civic activity and a surface area of over 10 hectares. In the 3rd century, it became the seat of a bishop as the town's name is mentioned four times in lists of bishops from councils, including that of Carthage in 256. The end of prosperity is dated to the end of the first third of the 3rd century with the restoration of the damage caused by the Crisis of the Third Century that took place after 285.

The Beccut cippus dates from the years 250–260. It evokes the memory of a young woman, Beccut, who died in her early twenties and was cremated according to local tradition. The Makthar archaeological site has revealed fifteen funerary poems dated between the 3rd and 6th centuries, but the earliest ones date no further than the end of the Severan dynasty and make up a group of nine artefacts to which the Beccut cippus belongs.

=== Discovery and study ===
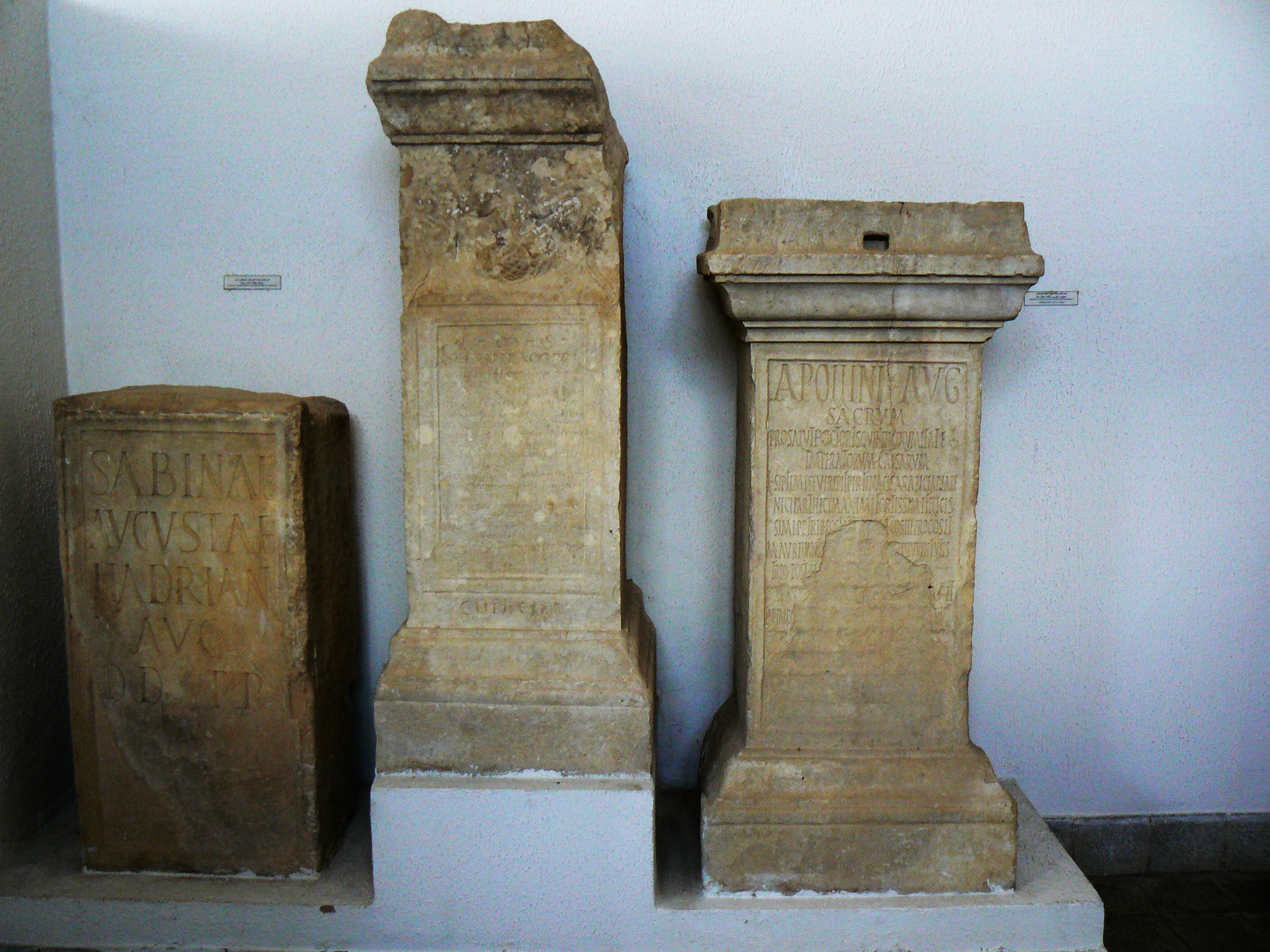
Group of lapidary items in the Makthar Museum, including the Beccut cippus in the center.

According to Jean-Marie Lassère, the study of the epigraphy of African monuments must be cautious because of the "compartmentalized regions": funerary customs and formulas spread in different ways. The excavations at Makthar have yielded numerous figurative representations, all of which are useful for dating monuments. However, the form of the letters must be treated with caution, given the provincial nature of the work, which was carried out by "unskilled country lapidarists", and paleography is not sufficient for dating.

The cippus was discovered in 1953, published the following year (B.A.C., 1954, p. 120); an in-depth study was published in 1970. The site revealed four other cippes in 1965.

The area in which it was found contained numerous remains of monumental mausoleums. The inscriptions found during the excavations reveal around 15% of the members of the college of local decurions in the second third of the 2nd century, and no members of the lower social classes.

== Description ==
=== General description ===
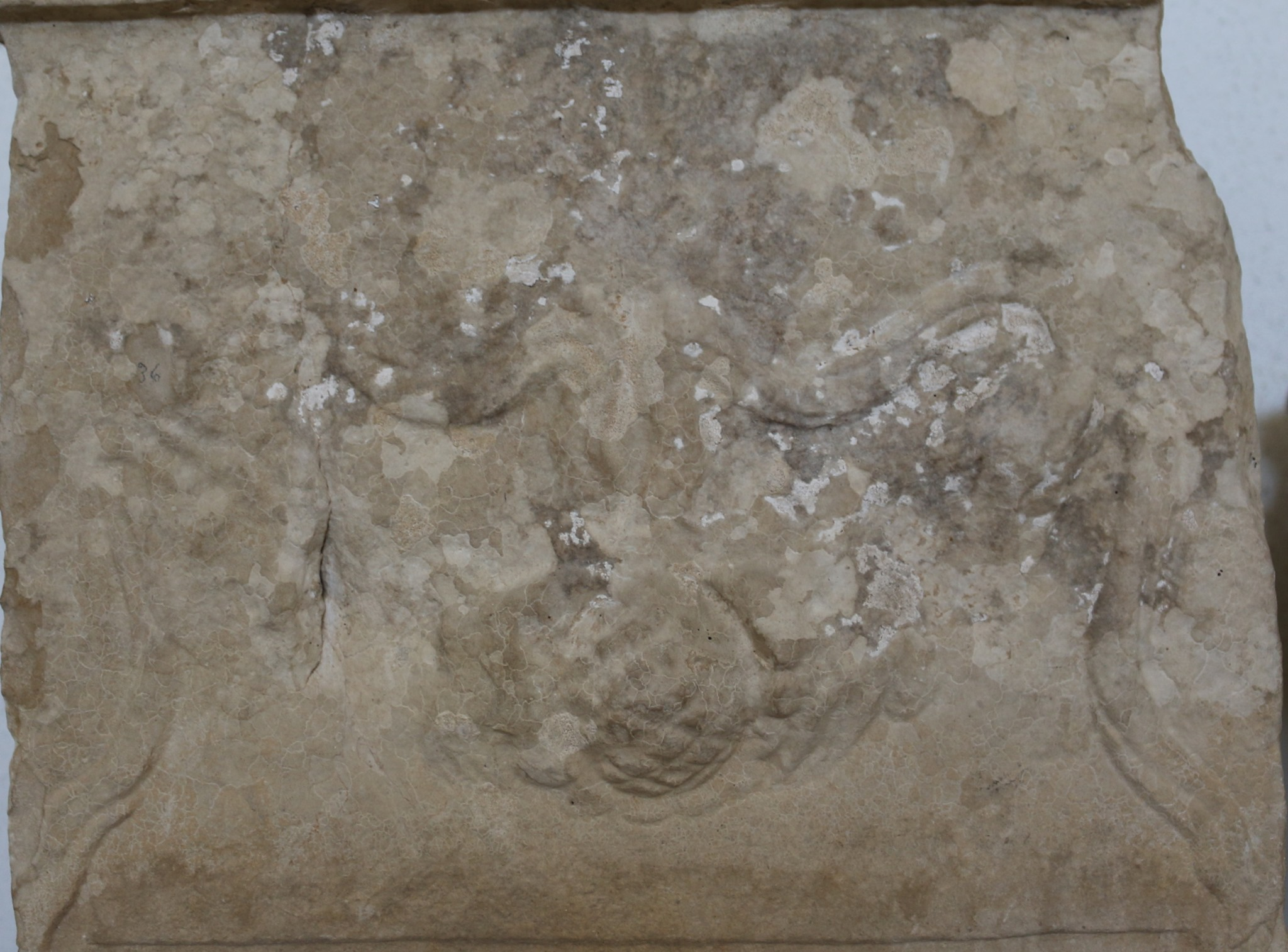
Carved detail with a garland and a pinecone.

The word cippus is "used too loosely in epigraphic literature", etymologically meaning "an upright stone". The term is often used in the context of Roman Africa to refer to funerary monuments. Funerary altars are often referred to as cippus in the literature. The adoption of the funerary custom of altars instead of steles did not predate the 2nd century, at the beginning of the "apogee of Africa", and spread massively in the following century.

The Beccut cippus is of the arulae-pillar type. It is carved from limestone and measures 1.60 m (5.2 ft) high by 0.45 m (1.47 ft) wide and 0.55 m (1.80 ft) thick. The upper part is broken on the right.

The cippus features a large area of text, above which is a degraded garland and a pinecone. The garland carved in stone reproduces the garlands "hung on tombs on the occasion of celebrations". The altar was adorned before sacrifices, in particular those linked to the festival of Rosalia. This Roman funerary festival was introduced to Makhtar when the town became a colony.

=== Inscription ===
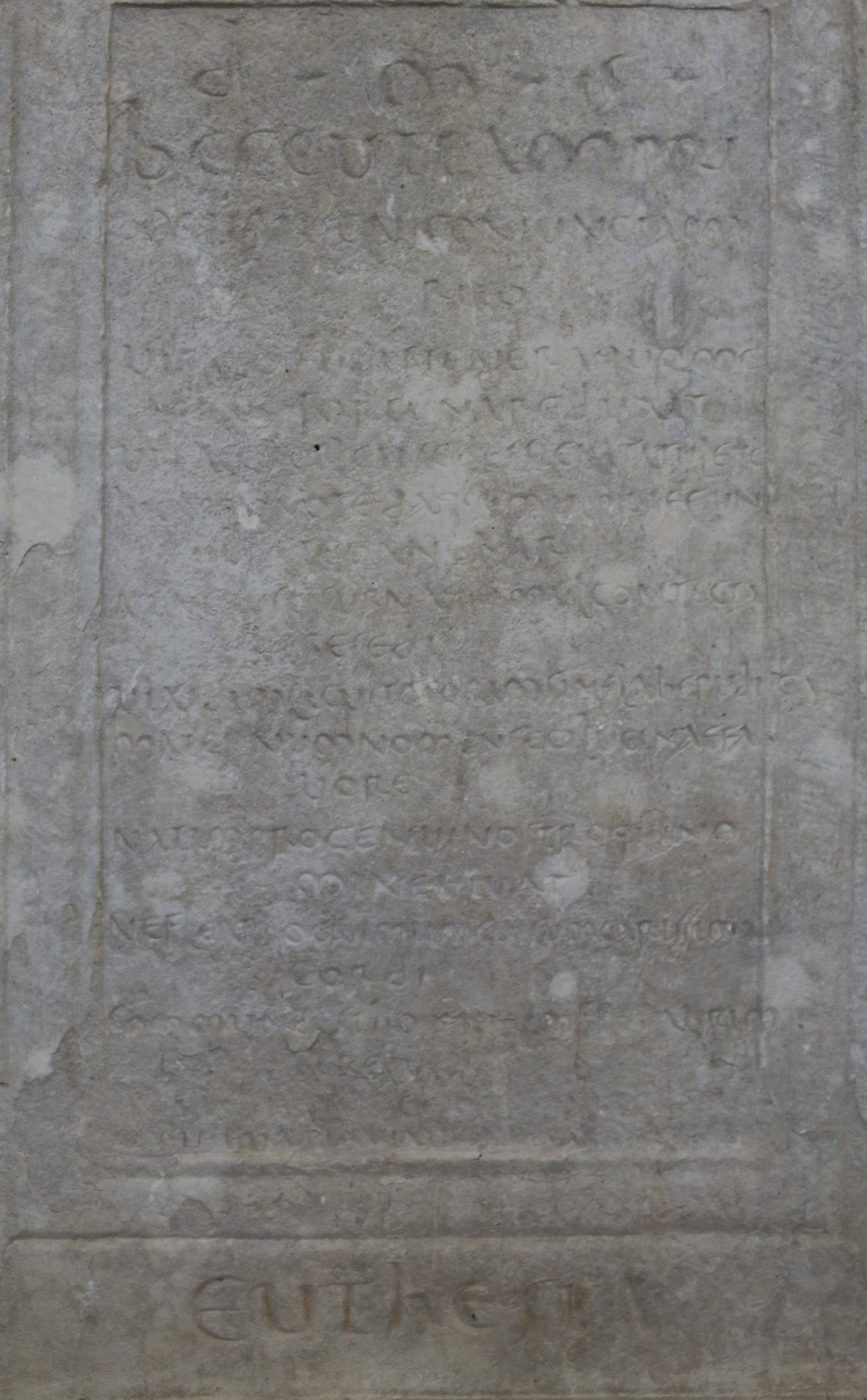
General view of the part of the cippus bearing Latin inscriptions.

The cippus features a 22-line inscription and, below it, the word "Euthesia", outside the frame. The last four lines have gaps. The artifact is the only stele with a known verse epitaph, apart from the Makthar Harvester epitaph, the "most famous Mactar inscription".

The shape of the letters, which do not fit neatly into the listed categories (uncial, Roman cursive, etc.), led Jean Mallon to describe this as a new school of paleography, "marking the advent of modern Latin writing". Jean Mallon has carried out a comparative study of the cippus script and that of an Oxyrhynchus papyrus, in particular no. 668, which contains an epitome of Titus Livius and was found in 1903. The manuscript has been dated to the 3rd century, and Mallon suggests the birth of writing in what is now Tunisia. The calligraphy used by the lapidarist is three times larger than on the scroll and "the proportions are exactly the same". The inscription is chiselled "in the graphic style of a contemporary book".

The first line of the text and the last two are typical of such funerary monuments, but in between is a poem of ten hexameters. The text contains prosodic errors, and the author of the inscription appears to be an "improvised poet", according to Édouard Galletier.

Beccut speaks in the text. The two lines giving the deceased's full name are badly damaged. The inscription form includes an "abbreviated invocation to the Manes", the name of the deceased and his age.

=== Funerary inscription ===
1. D*M*S*
2. BECCVTIAMPRÍ
3. MVMILONICONIVNCTAMA
4. RITO
5. VIRGORVDISTENERAQVOME
6. FORTVNAREDVXIT
7. VITAESETLETISEDESSICFATATVLERE
8. HICHYMNOTEDAQSIMVLPRAEEVN
9. TECANEBAR
10. NVNCVVSTISVRNAQSIMVLCONTECTA
11. RESEDI
12. VIXIDVMLICVITMORVMSINELABEPVDICA
13. MATERNVMNOMENFECILVCINAEFA
14. VORE
15. NATVMPROGENVINOSTROQVINO
16. MINEVIVAT
17. NEFLEATHOCNIMIVMCVISVMCARISSIMA
18. CORDI
19. COMMVNEESTHOMINVMFVNEBREM
20. [..]ERELA[......]
21. [....]L[....]EIA[............]
22. [..]RISSIMAPIAVIXITANNISXV[....]
23. EVTHESIA

=== Body ===
1. |D(iis) M(anibus) S(acrum)
2. |Beccut iam pri|mum Iloni coniuncta ma|rito
3. |uirgo rudis tenera quo me| Fortuna reduxit
4. |uitae set leti sedes sic fata tulere
5. |hic hymno tedaq(ue) simul praeeun| te canebar
6. |nunc uustis urnaq(ue) simul contecta | resedi
7. |uixi dum licuit morum sine labe pudica
8. |maternum nomen feci Lucinae fa| uore
9. |natum progenui nostro qui no|mine uiuat
10. |ne fleat hoc nimium cui sum carissima | cordi
11. |commune est hominum funebrem |[qu]erela[m.....]
12. [....]l[...]eia[............]|[..]rissima pia vxit annis XV[....]
13. Euthesia

=== English translation ===
"I, Beccut, first united with my husband Ilo (?), a novice and youthful virgin, in the place where Fortuna led me, the dwelling place of my life, but also the place of my demise - so the Fates willed - here I was celebrated both by the Hymen and by the nuptial torch carried before me, now I lie buried both in the tomb and in the urn. I have lived as long as I was allowed, chaste and unblemished in my morals; Lucina's favor has earned me the title of mother: I have given birth to a son; may he live in my place! May he not weep too much over my fate, he to whose heart I am so dear: it is the human condition to have to weep over the dead (?)."

The end of the text cannot be translated due to gaps in the stone or the term used, "Euthesia"; the precise age of the deceased is one of these gaps.

== Interpretation ==
Sacrifices cannot take place above the monument's table due to its height, even though it is carved in the shape of an altar.

A comparative study of the pillar altars found on the archaeological site by Gilbert Charles-Picard suggests that the Beccut cippus dates the death of Makthar's harvester after 260, while the epigraphic study notes that "the writing is not identical"; the harvester died at an old age and his ascension may date from the city's period of prosperity, between 210 and 235.

=== Makthar social study document ===
Peregrines, after obtaining Roman citizenship, kept their "barbarian name" as their cognomen. In the evolution of the Roman name over the course of the 3rd century, the praenomen gave way to the cognomen, "the only personal name used in everyday life".

The main interest of the cippus is onomastic. Beccut is the cognomen of the deceased, indicating a Punic or Libyan origin. It would be the feminine form of the name BG'T, Bogud, a princely name. The deceased may have had two cognomina, one in Latin and the other in the native language. The husband's cognomen may have been Milo. The cognomen of African origin can be seen, in the words of Jean-Marie Lassère, as "the revenge of indigenous tradition, relegating the gentilice, symbol of Romanization, to the shadows." As for the husband's name, ILONI, this is not explained by the Punic language, and specialists suggest the reading MILONI due to haplography, the dropping of one of the letters. The cognomen Milo was prestigious and its attribution to his son is possible by "a provincial scholar."

Although the document gives no information on the couple's social position, it is assumed that they belonged to the city's "well-to-do bourgeoisie." The senatorial and equestrian families were not easily distinguishable in the city, and the Curiate was open to people of modest means "by dint of hard work." The cognomen Beccut betrays a "recent promotion."

=== Document about a member of a religious community ===
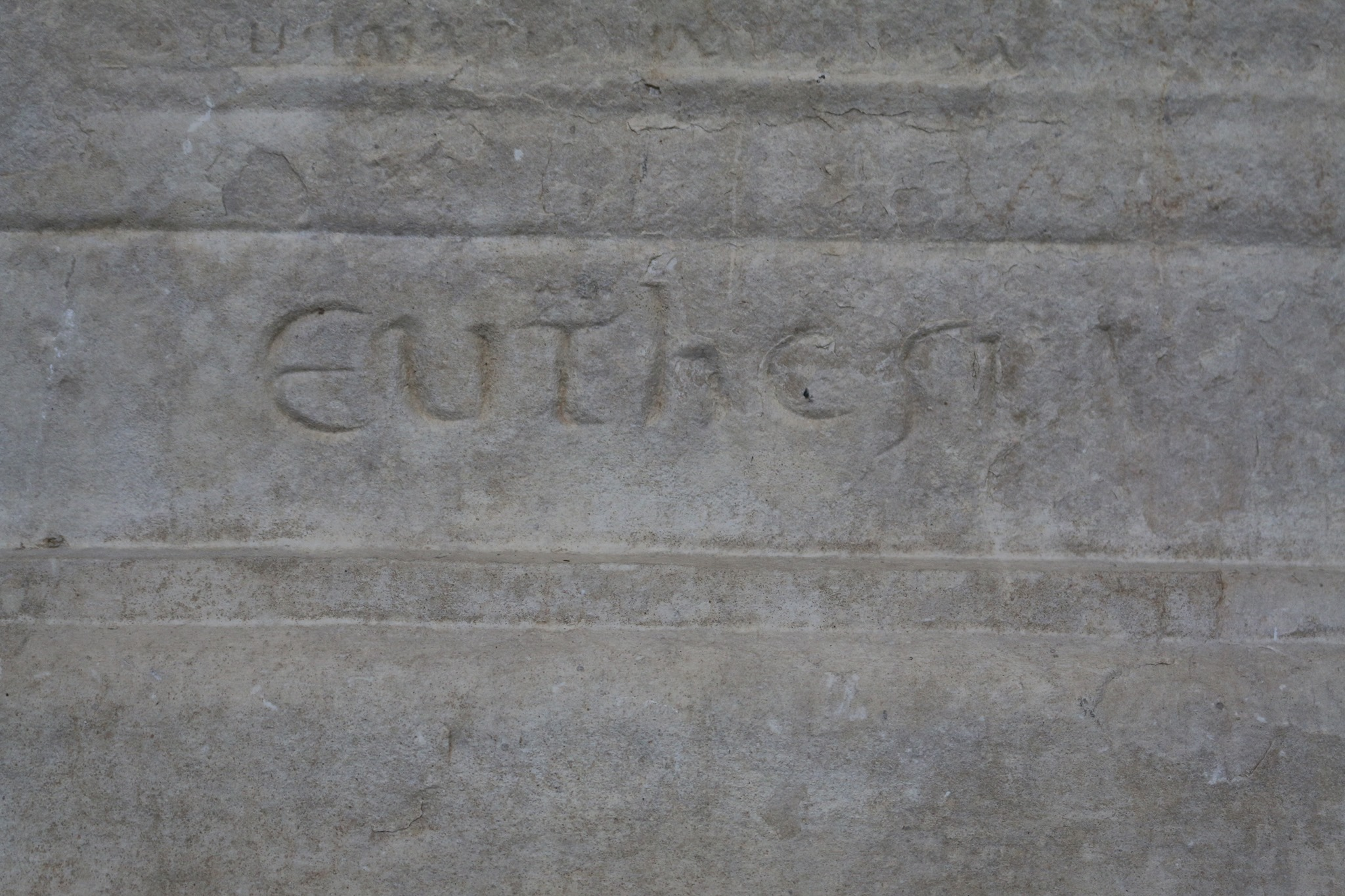
Detail of the lower part of the cippus with the word "Euthesia".

The invocation of the dead man's name was important because, according to Ausonius, it made it possible to "bring the dead back from oblivion for a moment and mingle him with the living."

The term "Euthesia" evokes a religious community. The city's wealthy social classes honored Magna Mater and Liber, and Bacchism is reflected in the greater presence of Dionysiac symbols on funerary monuments, such as a pine cone on Beccut's cippus. However, the latter is used as much for the cult of Saturn as for the Magna Mater or Liber. Beccut may have been a Bacchante, and "Euthesia" may have been one of the "mystical vocables", the Eu prefix "belonging to the technical language of medicine." The signum on the monument is perhaps a sign of membership of the Isiac community. Although the cult is little known in Makthar, initiation elsewhere is possible. The cult of Dionysus and Osiris may have come close, according to a "commonly accepted assimilation."

The cult of Isis imposed on its followers "a severe discipline, even to the point of asceticism", and Beccut's epitaph accords with these principles of life. The word "Euthesia" at the end of the inscription introduces "an atmosphere of strange mystery."

=== Funerary poem ===
The text of the cippus is of the encomium type, and the poet evokes "banalities and clichés": "Beccut was modest and had a son." Lucina is an epithet of Juno, "tutelary goddess of childbirth." Evoking feminine virtue in the text is "traditional praise". She was born, lived and died in the same place. "Married very young", she did not die in childbirth because of the allusion to divinity, nor because of an accident: illness undoubtedly took her, "in a manner as banal as it was distressing." The lifespan indicated, Vixit annos, is mostly found on monuments dating from the 2nd or 3rd century.

The expression DMS (Diis Manibus Sacrum, to the sacred Manes gods) is stereotyped. However, the use of the invocation to the Manes gods, early on the African monuments of the Proconsular capital or Dougga, is late "as one moves away from Carthage." Consolation is a "commonplace theme."

The verse study reveals "no emotion" on the part of the husband, who according to Gilbert Charles-Picard "must have been in a hurry to remarry." The poem's style "is characterized by its banality, both clumsy and pompous". The language is described by Charles-Picard as "artificial" and having nothing to do with the language spoken by the local population.
