= Horus on the Crocodiles =

Group of ancient Egyptian amulets

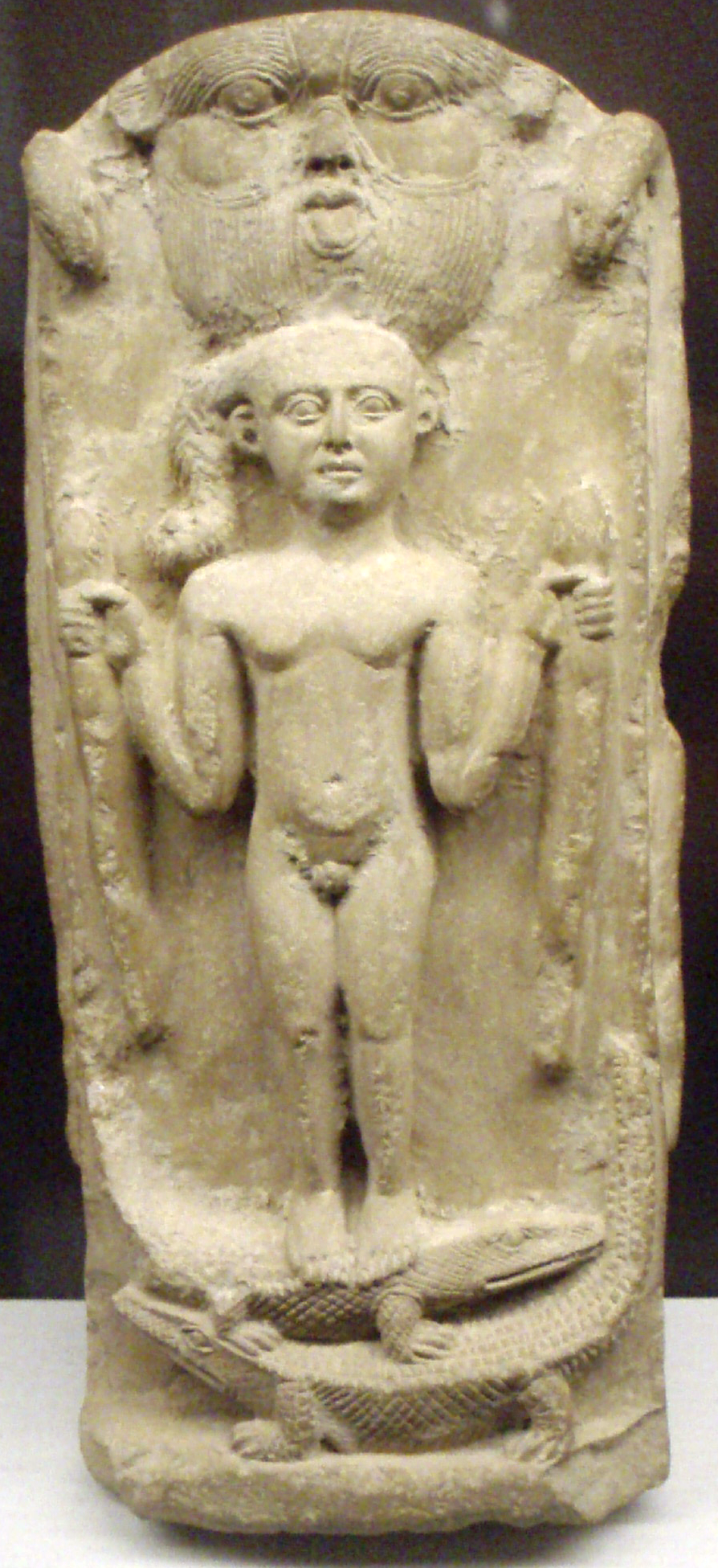
Horus cippus (Rosicrucian Egyptian Museum)

Horus on the Crocodiles is a motif found on ancient Egyptian healing amulets from the Third Intermediate Period until the end of the Ptolemaic dynasty, as well as on larger cippi and stelae. Both the portable amulets and the larger statues are sometimes referred to simply as Horus stelae.

The Horus amulet or stele usually takes the form of a stone slab depicting the god Horus in the form of a child (Harpocrates) standing on two crocodiles and holding other dangerous animals such as snakes and scorpions. In older specimens, the head of the protective god Bes is depicted above the child's figure, protruding from the body of the cippus, which later became part of the frame. The stelae contain Egyptian hieroglyphs with mythological and magical texts recited in the treatment of diseases and for protection against stings or bites. This portrayal is thought to follow the myth of Horus triumphing over dangerous animals in the marshes of Khemmis (Akhmim).

Well-known specimens in this genre include the so-called Metternich stela, the Banobal stele, the Egyptian Museum's Djedhor healing statue, and the Louvre's Priest of Bastet statue.

== Gallery ==
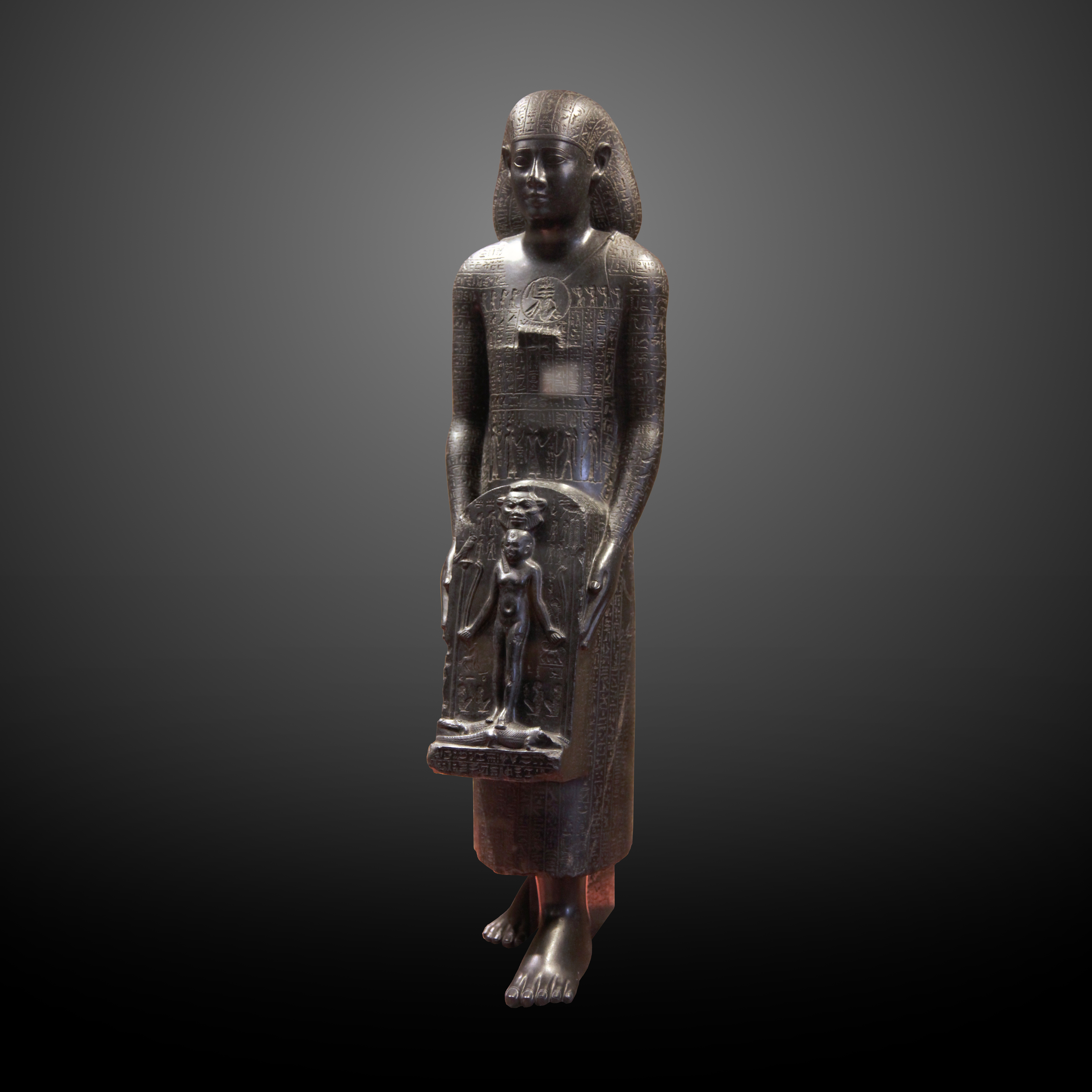
Priest of Bastet (Louvre)

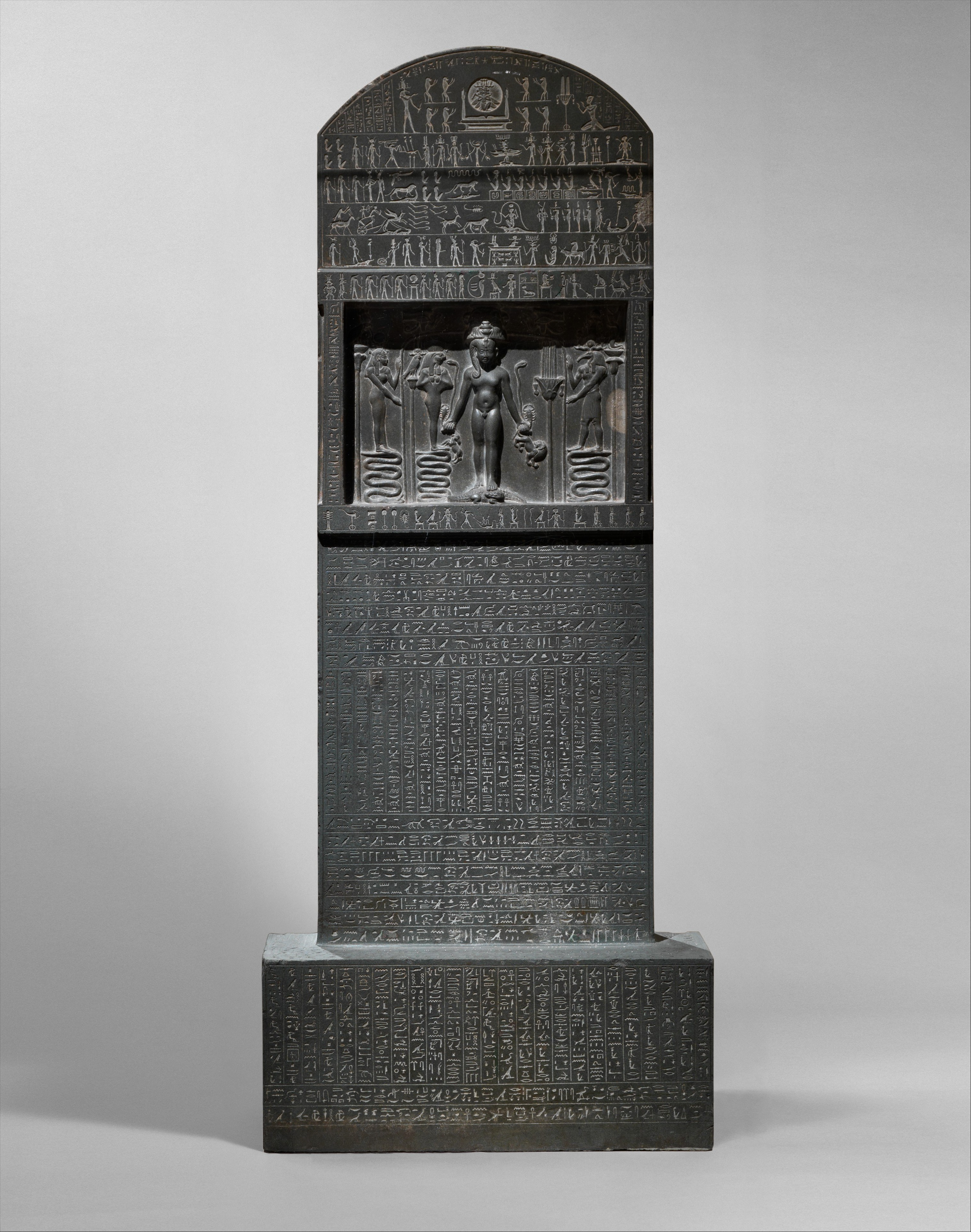
Metternich stela (MET Museum)

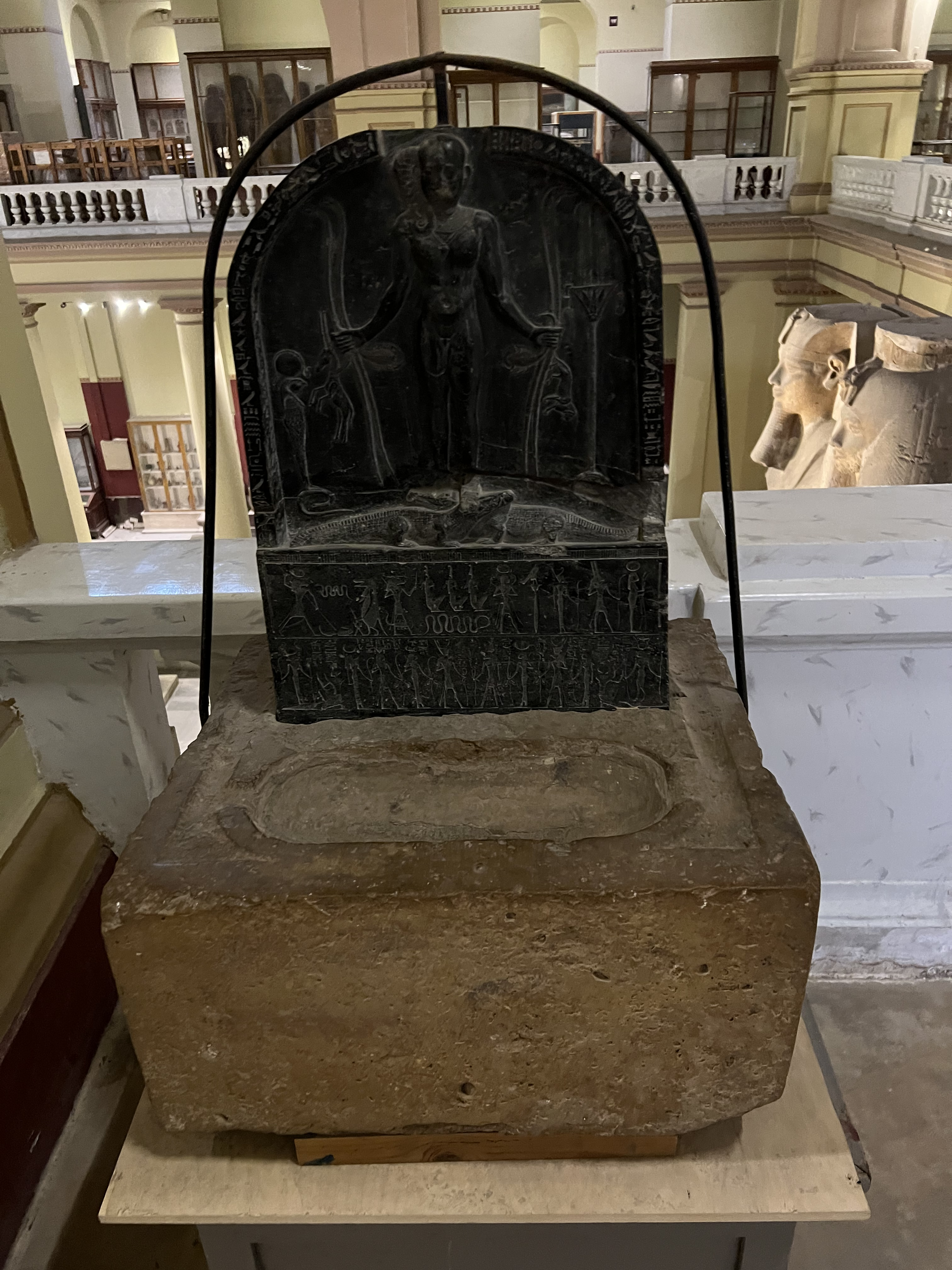
Banobal stele (Egyptian Museum in Cairo)

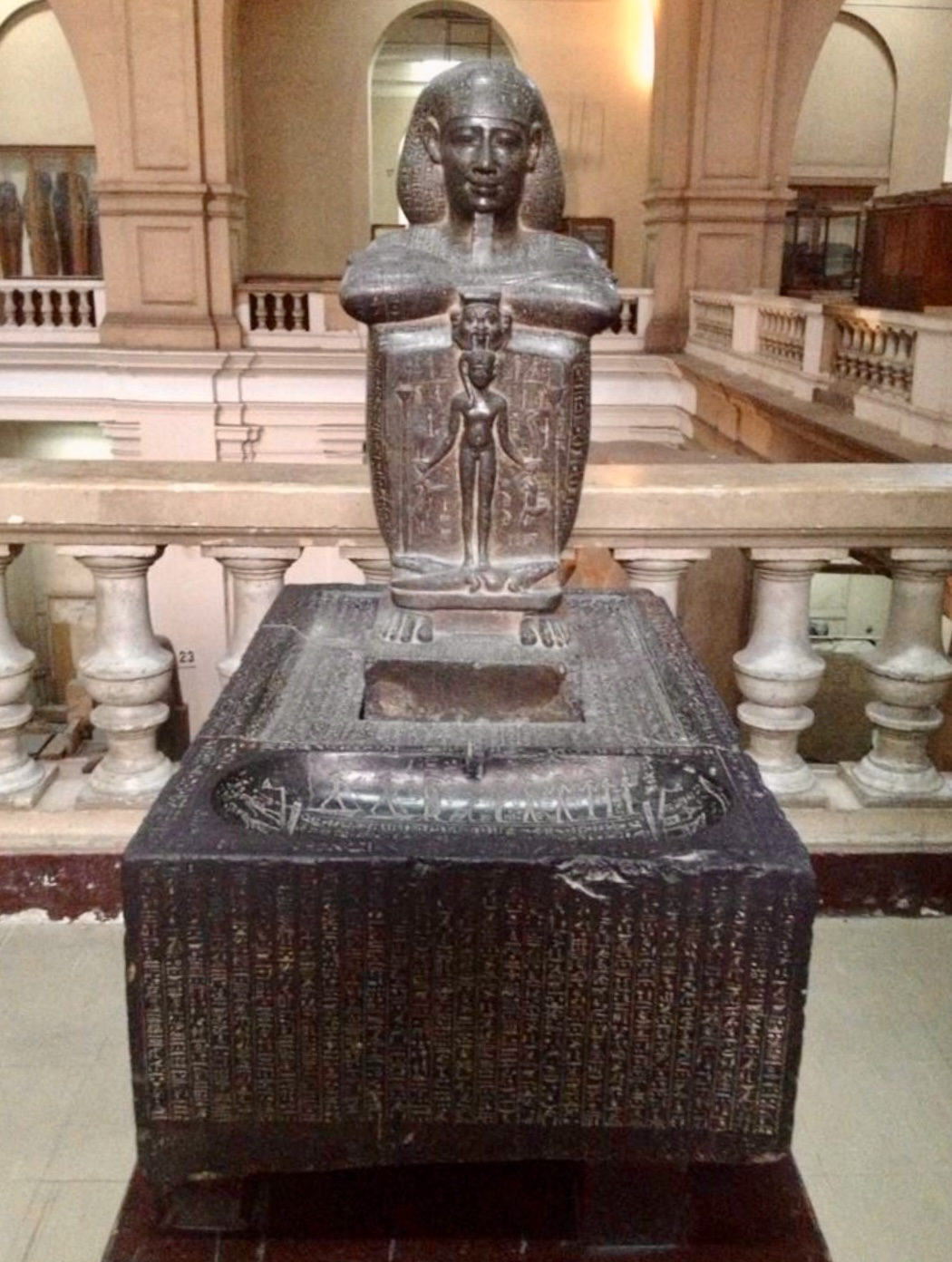
Djedhor healing statue (Egyptian Museum in Cairo)

== Bibliography ==
=== General ===
- Sternberg-el-Hotabi 1994. C. Sternberg-el-Hotabi. Der Untergang der Hieroglyphenschrift, Chronique d'Egypte 69 (1994). 218-248
- Andrews, Carol, 1994. Amulets of Ancient Egypt. London: British Museum Press.
- Gasse, Annie, 2004. Les stèles d'Horus sur les crocodiles. Paris: Éditions de la Réunion des musées nationaux.
- Quack, Joachim, 2002. "Review of Sternberg-el Hotabi 1999," Orientalische Literaturzeiting 97:6, 713-39.
- Ritner, Robert K., 1989. "Horus on the Crocodiles: a Juncture of Religion and Magic in Late Dynastic Egypt." In Religion and Philosophy in Ancient Egypt, ed. William Kelly Simpson. New Haven: Yale University Press. 103-16.
- Draycott, Jane (2011-10-30). "Size matters: Reconsidering Horus on the crocodiles in miniature". Pallas (86). OpenEdition: 123–133. doi:10.4000/pallas.2124. ISSN 0031-0387.
- Seele, Keith C. (1947). "Horus on the Crocodiles". Journal of Near Eastern Studies. 6 (1). University of Chicago Press: 43–52. doi:10.1086/370811. ISSN 0022-2968. JSTOR 542233. S2CID 161676438.

=== Individual stelae ===
- Kákosy, László; Moussa, Ahmed M. (1998). "A Horus Stela with Meret Goddesses". Studien zur Altägyptischen Kultur. 25: 143–159. JSTOR 25152758.
- Berlev/Hodjash 1982. O. Berlev/S Hodjash. Egyptian Stelae in the Pushkin Museum of Fine Arts. Moscow
- Berlandini 2002. J. Berlandini. Un monument magique du "Quatrieme prophete d'Amon" Nakhtefmout. in Y. Koenig. La Magie en Egypte: a la recherche d'une definition. Paris. 83-148
- Grzegorz, First (2013). "The Horus cippus from the National Museum in Poznań". Folia Orientalia. 50: 323–334.

== See also ==
- Master of Animals – a motif in ancient art similar to that of Horus on the Crocodiles.
