= Arulae =

Type of altar found in ancient civilizations

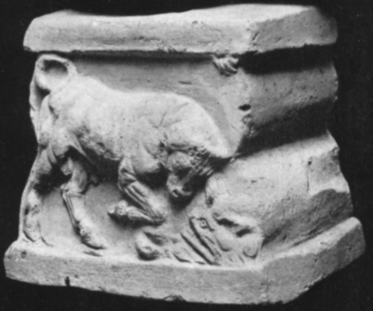
Hourglass-shaped arula depicting a bull charging a serpent

Arulae were small altars that appeared throughout Central Italy and Magna Graecia from the 6th to the 2nd centuries BCE, primarily in sanctuaries or necropolises.

== Design ==
Most arulae were fashioned using stepped molding, and they near unilaterally feature a base and crown molding. There was still significant diversity amongst the structure of arulae: Amongst mold-made arulae, for instance, the castings are almost never identical, and only some have a cornice. In terms of dimensions, they range from 8–55 centimetres (3.1–21.7 in) in width and up to 45–50 centimetres (18–20 in) in height. Samples of arulae from Largo Argentina were fashioned using widely available materials and common architectural techniques, attesting to a relatively cheap manufacturing process. There is limited evidence for workshops dedicated to the creation of arulae, though one hourglass-shaped arula Largo Argentina contains, on its back, three mars shaped like the letter N, which—given that it was added before the vessel was fully baked—is most likely a production mark. Another mark of a similar shape appears on an arula from the Esquiline necropolis, perhaps indicating that the same local workshop was responsible for producing various arulae of different functions for separate sanctuaries. However, given that the hourglass-shaped vessel is the only of its type at Largo Argentina, it is more likely that this artifact was simply once intended for deposition at the Esquiline.

Stylistically, the arulae resembled their larger counterparts, and their design thus varied across regions in accordance with the artistic diversity of monumental altars themselves. At Largo Argentina, both the arulae and the monumental altars feature stepped molding articulated in a cyma reversa style and they both largely lack any decoration or adornment. Uniquely, however, one of the fourteen arulae from this site is marked by an hourglass shape. Typologically, the hourglass-shaped arulae are characterized by a square base that is both larger than the top and has more extensive molding. The sides progressively narrow as they extend towards the top, thus acquiring a double convex shape. Hourglass-shaped arulae feature more prominently amongst a set artifacts uncovered at the Sanctuary of Minerva in Lavinium, where archaeologists discovered five mold-made hourglass-shaped structures ornamented with a mythological scene or a palmette design that dated between the 5th and 4th centuries BCE. Such designs are reminiscent of other hourglass-shaped altars from the surrounding region, including one from a nearby temple in the forum of Lavinium, though no examples of this type of altar have been uncovered at the Sanctuary of Minerva itself.

Examples of nineteen parallelepiped and four cylindrical arulae have been uncovered at Pompeii, the former of which feature decorations that are stylistically consistent with those of the monumental altars. For instance, samples of rectangular arulae at Pompeii include a Doric frieze with bucrania accompanied by either rosettes in the metopes or paterae. Similarly, the altar from the Temple of Zeus Meilichios is bedecked with a Doric frieze containing metopes and triglyphs, as well as Ionic volutes. In contrast, the cylindrical arulae from Pompeii are stylistically closer to altars present in household lararia from the same site, such as the cylindrical altar from the lararium of the House of Popidius Priscus. In Sicily, the dominant style of arulae switched from rectangular to circular over time. From the 6th to the 5th centuries BCE, Sicilian arulae were primarily rectangular, as typified by a parallelepiped rectangular terracotta arula from Agrigento, which resembles the rectangular altars from the various temples throughout the city. However, during the 4th and 3rd centuries BCE, a type of cylindrical arula had emerged as the predominant style. The majority of Sicilian arulae during this period are associated with Demeter. For instance, a 114-centimetre (45 in) tall and 75-centimetre (30 in) wide arula from Gela portrays three female figures, most probably Demeter, Kore, and Aphrodite. Furthermore, a 24-centimetre (9.4 in) tall arula from Syracuse was discovered in the Sanctuary of Demeter and Kore.

== History ==
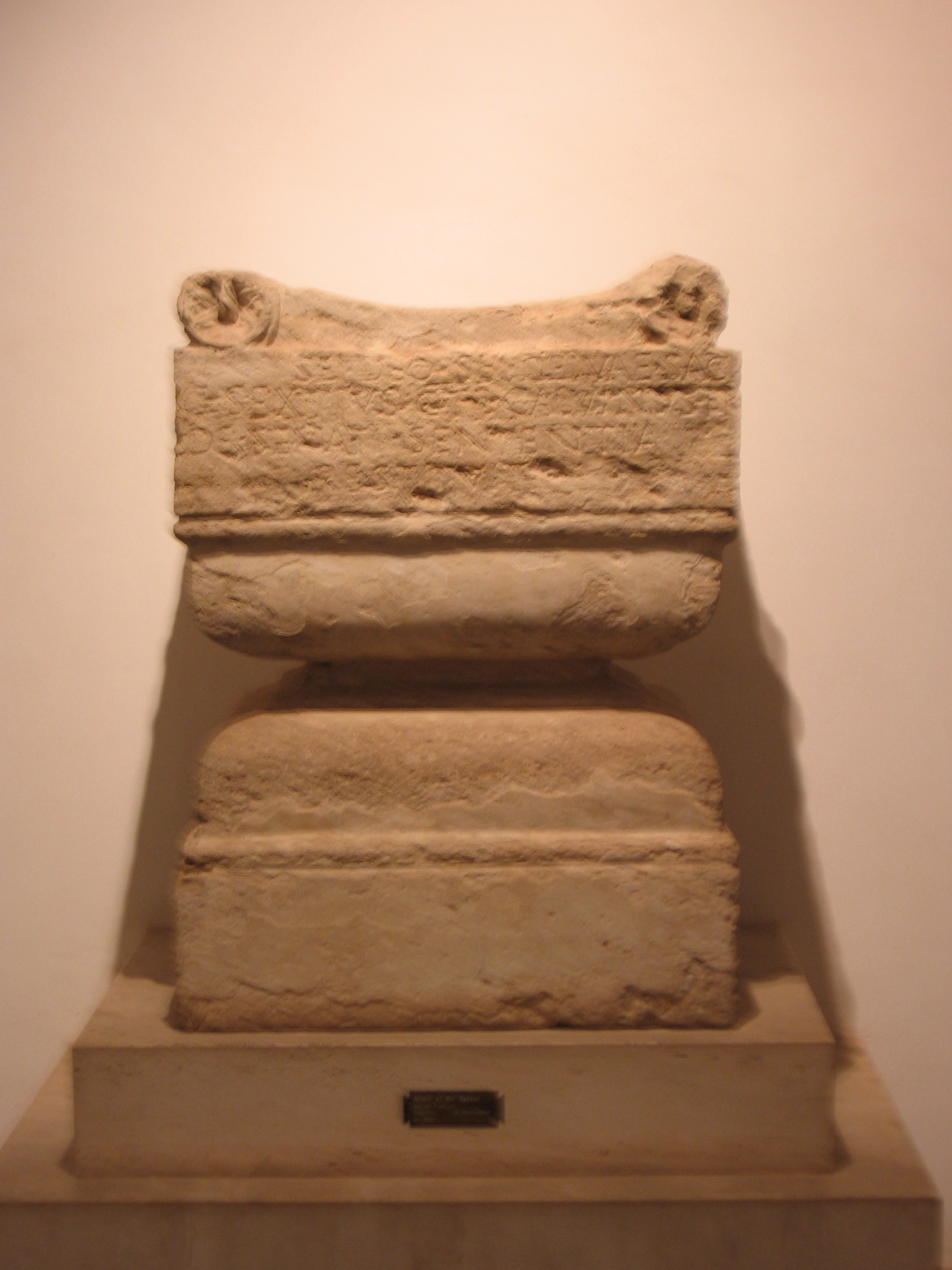
The altar of Calvinus

The earliest arulae are found in the Greek colonies of Sicily and Southern Italy, though they are hardly present in the Greek mainland, implying that they reflect a tradition either of local innovation or imported from elsewhere other than Greece. Some are found in Motya, which was historically a Phoenician colony, though these are of a slightly later date and are probably the result of importation. The arulae then spread northwards to other regions such as Rome or Capua, with some samples appearing in Hadria and Baccuco in Picenum. The Picene examples are possibly due to the influence of the Greek refugees who fled from Dionysius of Syracuse and established the city of Ancona around the year 380 BCE. Hourglass-shaped arulae are absent from Sicily and Southern Italy, implying that they emerged from a source other than the Greek colonies. According to the archaeologist Elizabeth Douglas van Buren, this alternative influence was perhaps the Etruscans, as—according to van Buren—Etruscan altars such as the altar of Calvinus on the Palatine are comparable in style.

== Function ==
It is likely that arulae were inexpensive, though this does not necessarily mean that they were not valuable. Instead, the significance of arulae was probably largely symbolic: They served as representations of standard altars, perhaps allowing suppliants to effectively partake in otherwise inaccessible rituals. Annual animal sacrifices were often unavailable to much of the Roman population, either because the ceremony was exclusive to the upper-classes or a specific group of people, or merely on account of over-crowding. Should a Roman have missed the public sacrifice for that year, the act of dedicating an arula could serve as a satisfactory replacement, as it would evoke at least the experience of the true participation in a sacrifice. Since arulae were typologically modeled after the particular variety of altar common to the local sanctuary, the act of their dedication would even more specifically call to mind local customs and the ancient rituals of the community. Arulae themselves do not appear to have been used in proper sacrificial rituals. In theory, it is possible that some arulae served as incense burners: There is evidence of a fire on at least one surviving arula, and some samples contain depressions on their tops, which could have functioned as basins for incense. However, overall, there is extremely little evidence for burning on the surviving arulae, implying that they were not frequently utilized for sacrifices or libations. Arulae were nevertheless sometimes provided with certain accoutrements to symbolize the act of sacrifice, such as model fruit offerings or depictions of fire. The extensive molding of arulae—which is disproportionate to their miniature scale—may have accentuated their symbolic value by aggrandizing the otherwise unimpressive structure.
