= Cippus =

Ancient Roman boundary marker or milestone

Various forms of cippi

A cippus (pl. cippi) was a low, round, or rectangular pedestal set up by the Ancient Romans for purposes such as a milestone or a boundary post. They were also used for somewhat differing purposes by the Etruscans and Carthaginians.

== Roman cippi ==
Roman cippi were made of wood or stone; inscriptions on the stone cippi indicate their function or the area that they surrounded, like sanctuaries and temple areas. In Rome they marked the limits of the pomerium after the city's walls were expanded further out, the course of aqueducts, and the cursus publicus. Cippi lined up in rows were also often numbered, often featuring the name of the person placing them or the distance to the nearest other cippus. The inscriptions on some cippi show that they were occasionally used as funeral memorials.

== Etruscan cippi ==
Between 800–100 BC, cippi were used by the Etruscans as tombstones, which were shaped differently depending on the place and time of origin. Cippi were set up as a stele, column or sculpture in the dromos of an Etruscan grave or at the grave entrance. They had magical and religious significance. Cippi may have the shape of a cube, knob, onion, egg, ball or cylinder. There are connections between certain shapes and the representation of canopic jars; cinerary urn that were made in the shape of a human torso, and the head as a lid.

- In Cerveteri, the cippi of female and male burials were different. Male dead received a column (phallus), women small houses or temples.
- The Pietra fetida monuments (6th – 5th centuries BC) from the area around Chiusi show a combination of the cinerary urn and cippus. They contain the ashes of the dead in an opening in their base.
- In Orvieto two so-called warrior head cippi have images of human heads (late 6th century BC).
- In Perugia, fluted columns with acanthus were used.
- From the 4th century BC cippi also have name inscriptions.

The "Cippus Abellanus" (in the Oscan language), like the "Cippus Perusinus", is not a tombstone.

== Punic cippi ==
Carthaginian cippi have a base similar to Egyptian steles, which are sometimes also referred to as cippi (for example the "Metternich Cippi" in the Metropolitan Museum of Art). They are found in North Africa, but also in Sardinia (Cagliari, Teti, Tharros), Sicily (Motya) and Spain (Huelva and Barcelona). The Cippi of Melqart, found in Malta, which bear a Phoenician and a Greek inscription, made it possible for the first time to understand the Phoenician alphabet.

== Gallery ==
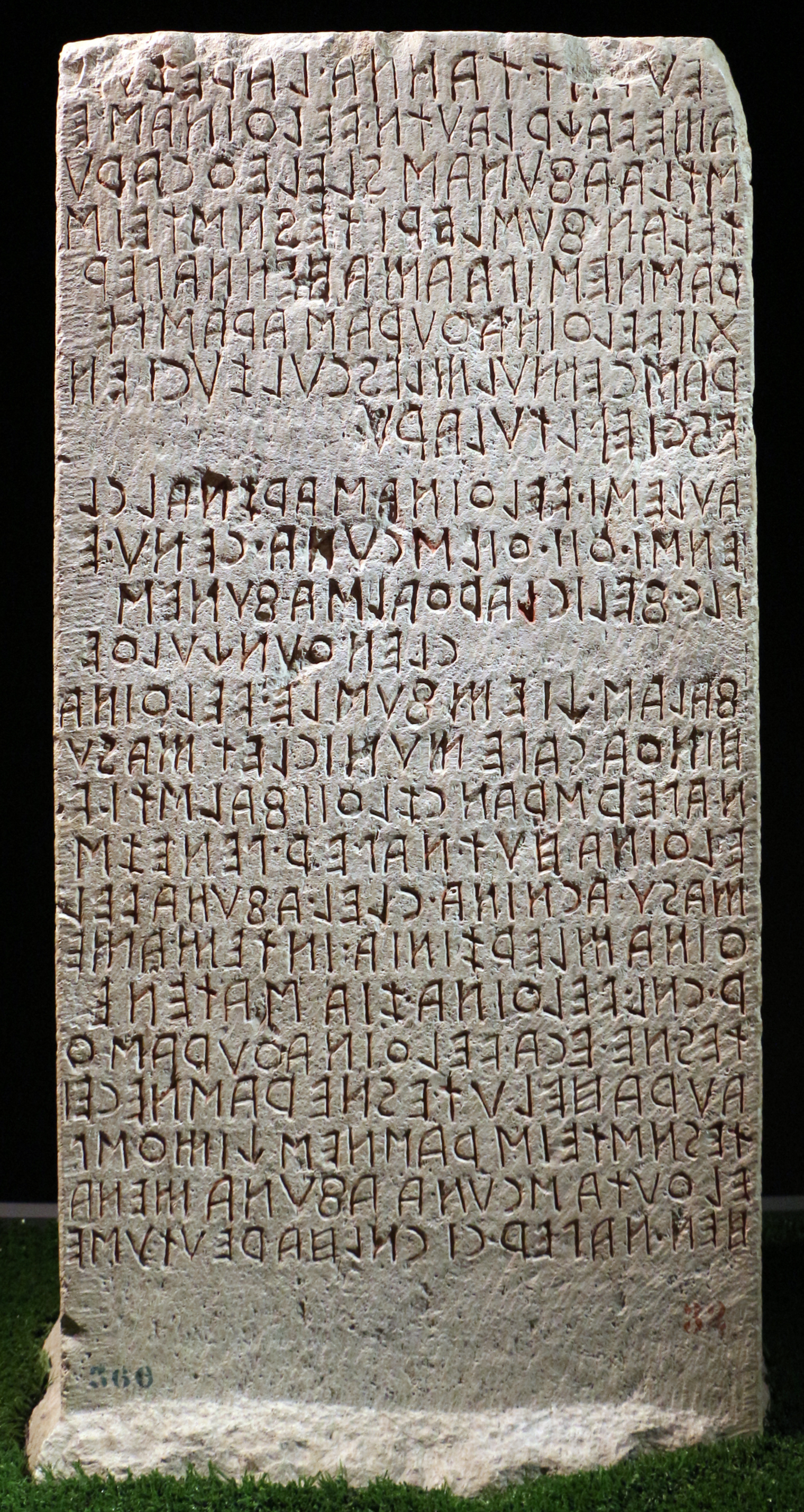
Cippus Perusinus

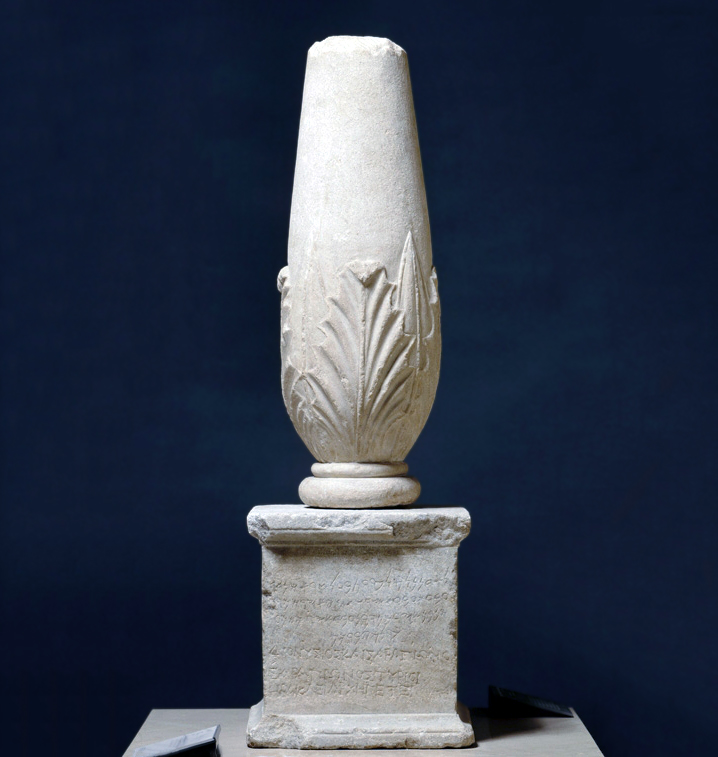
One of two Cippi of Melqart which Jean-Jacques Barthélemy used to decipher the Phoenician language.

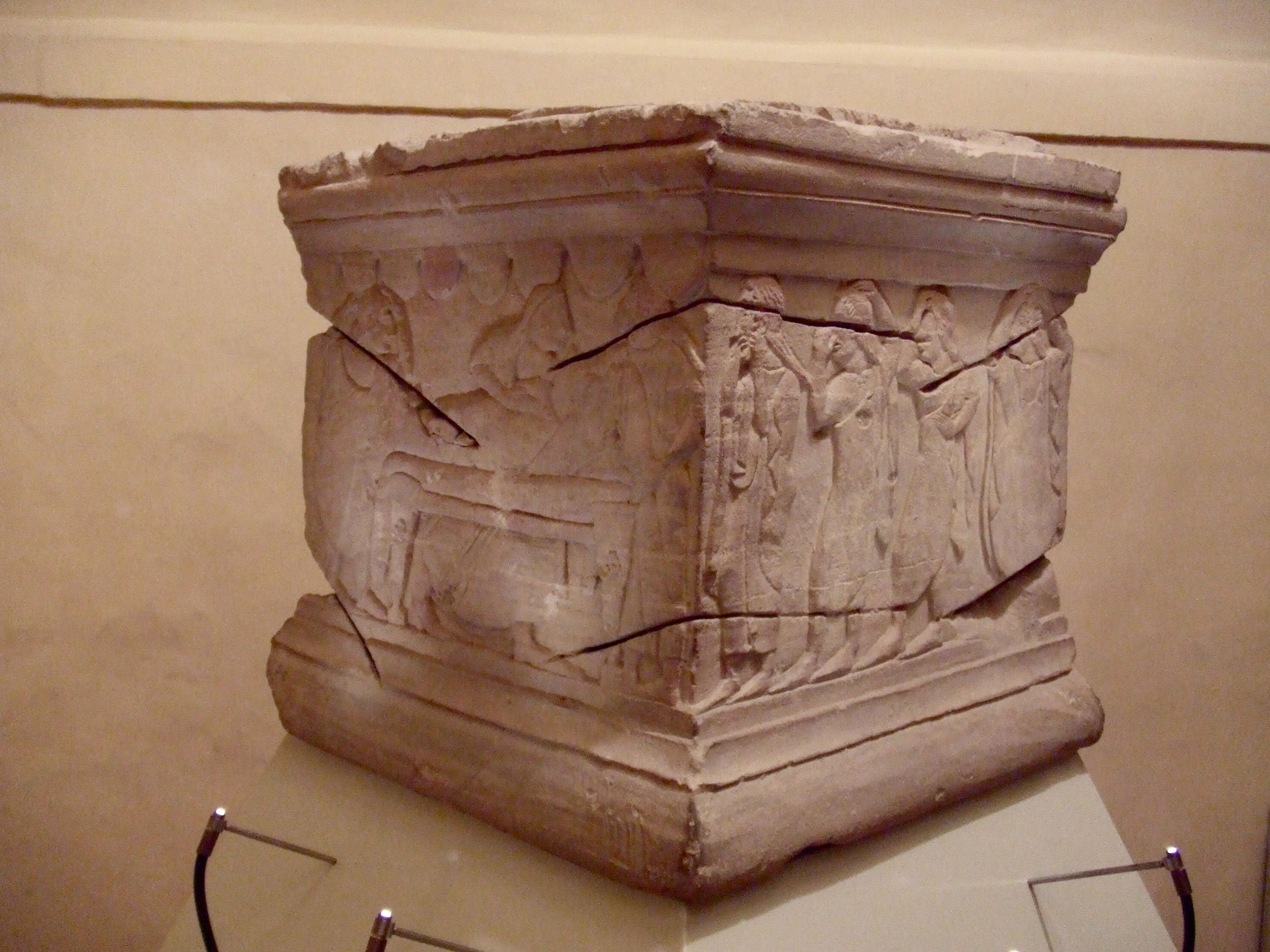
Etruscan "pietra fetida" cippus in Sarteano

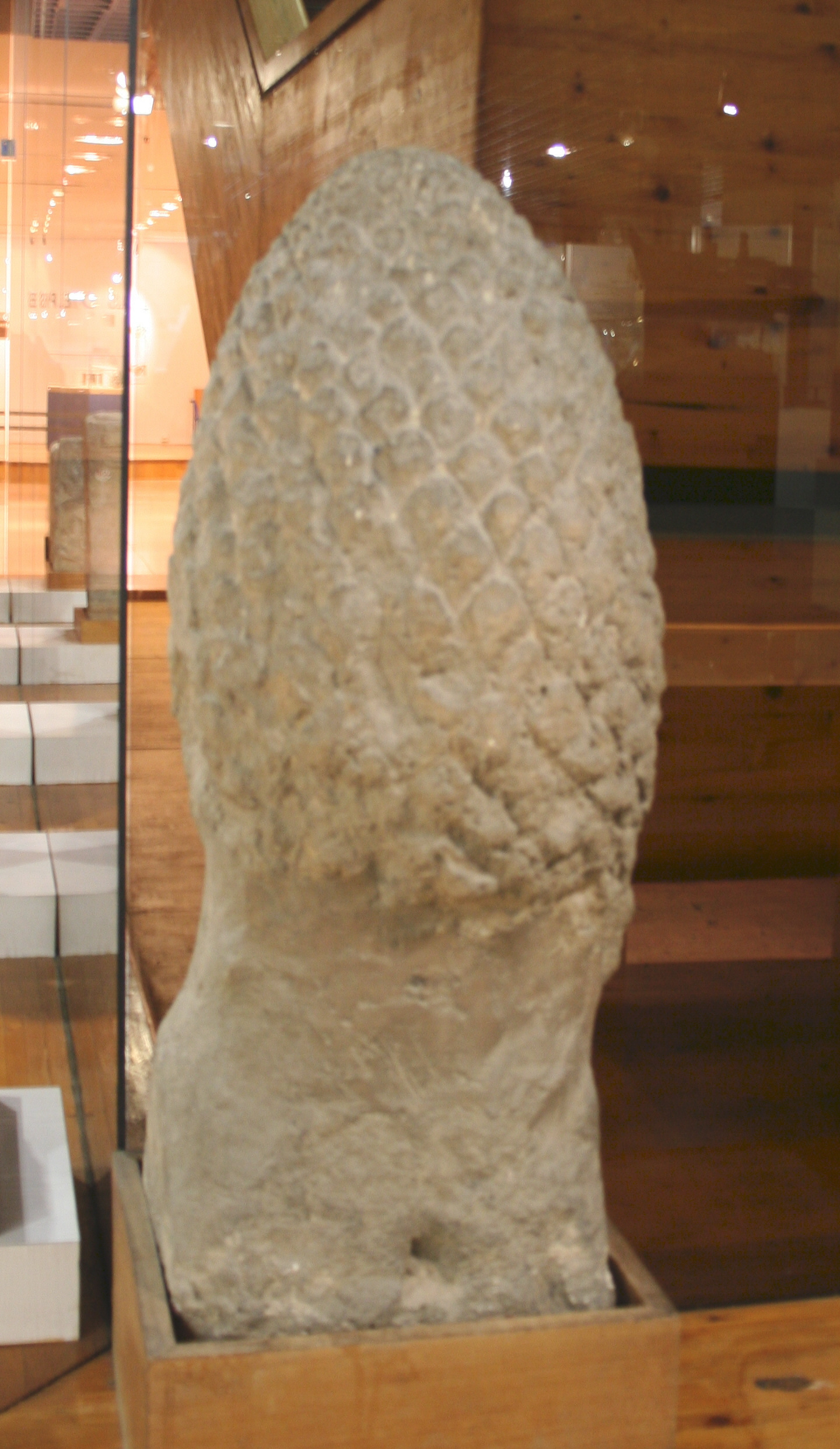
Cippus surmounted by a pine cone, which symbolizes the tree of life

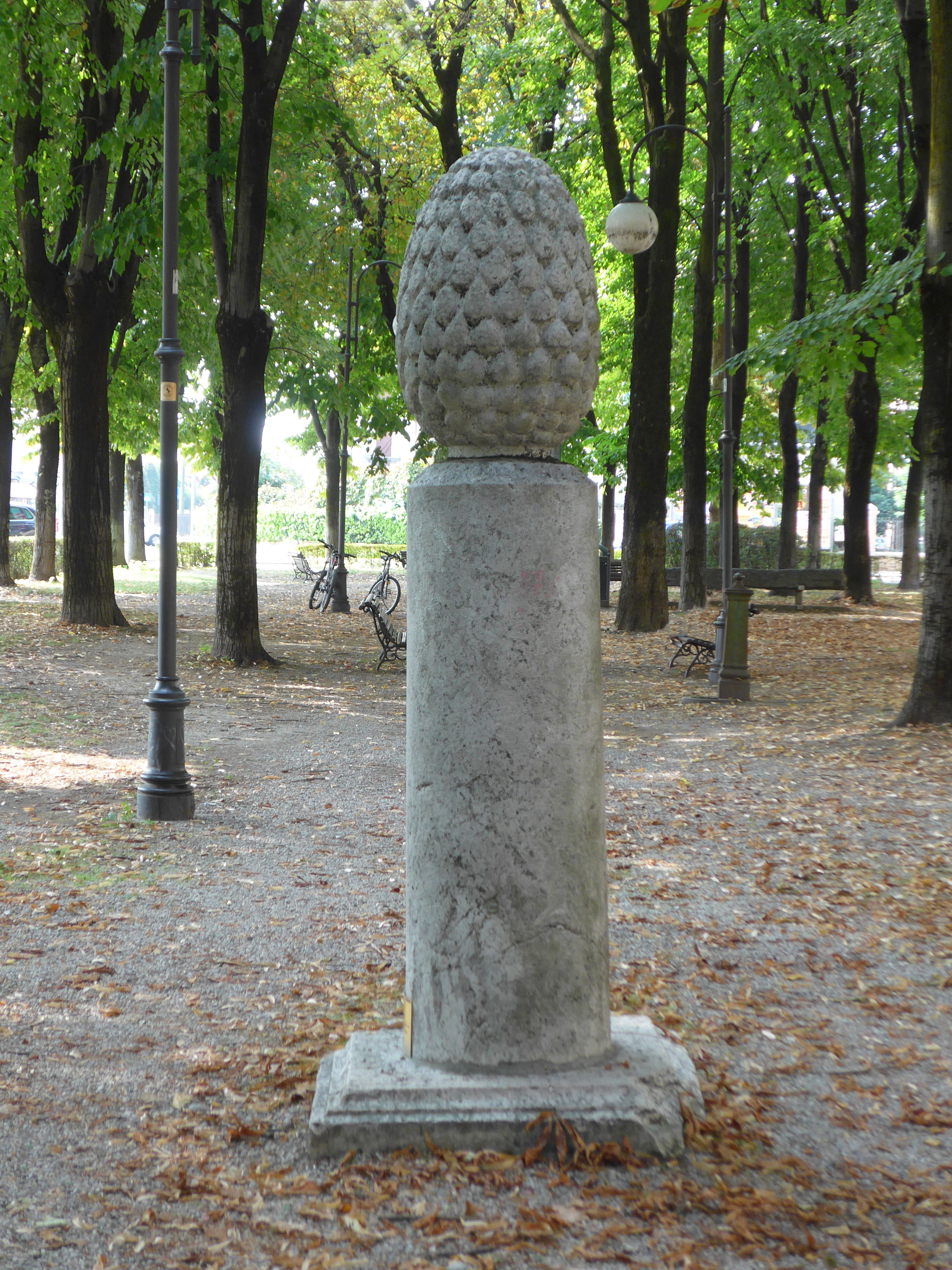
Castel Goffredo, La Pigna monument

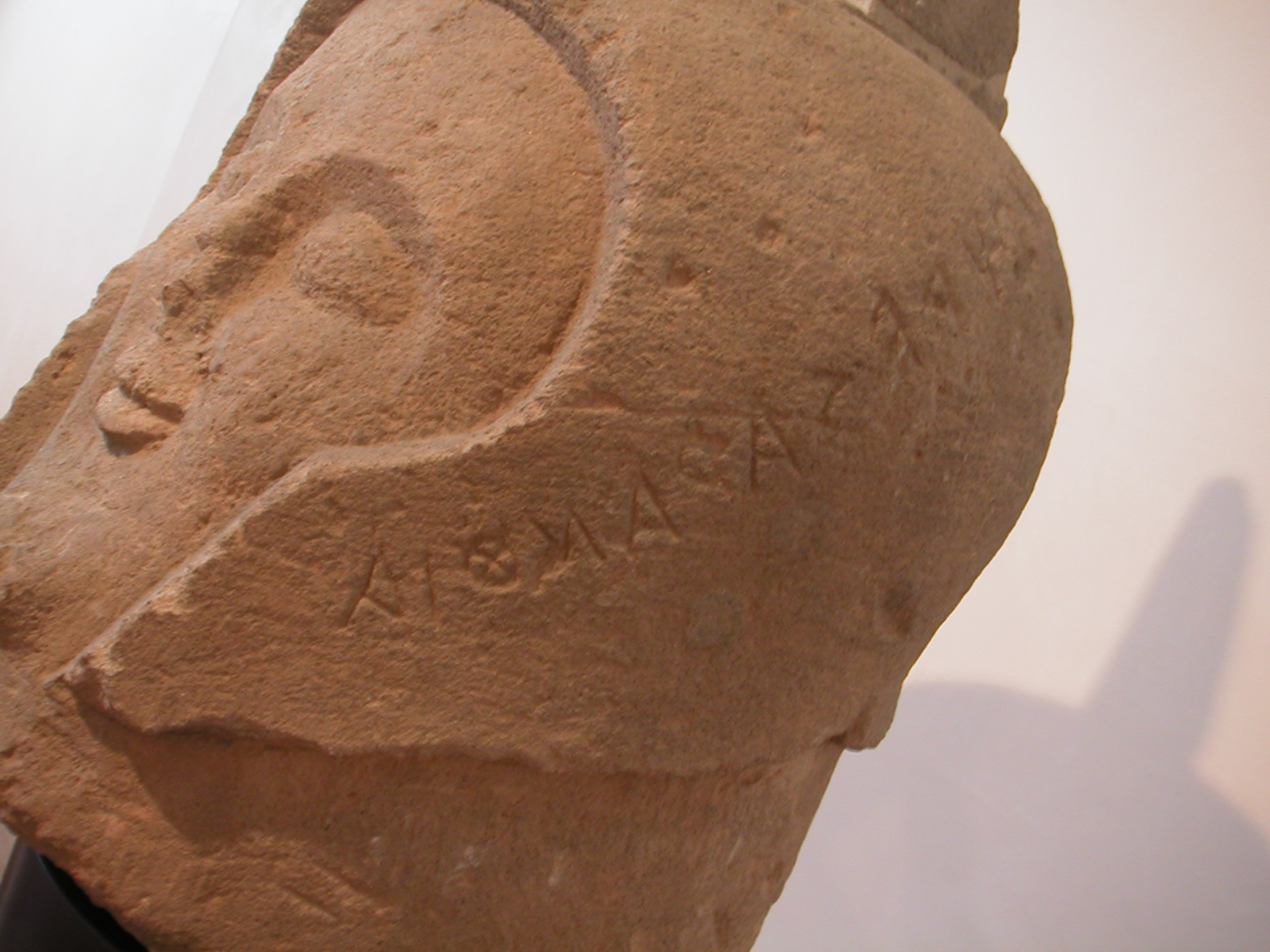
Etruscan warrior head cippus

== See also ==
- Beccut cippus
