= Banobal stele =

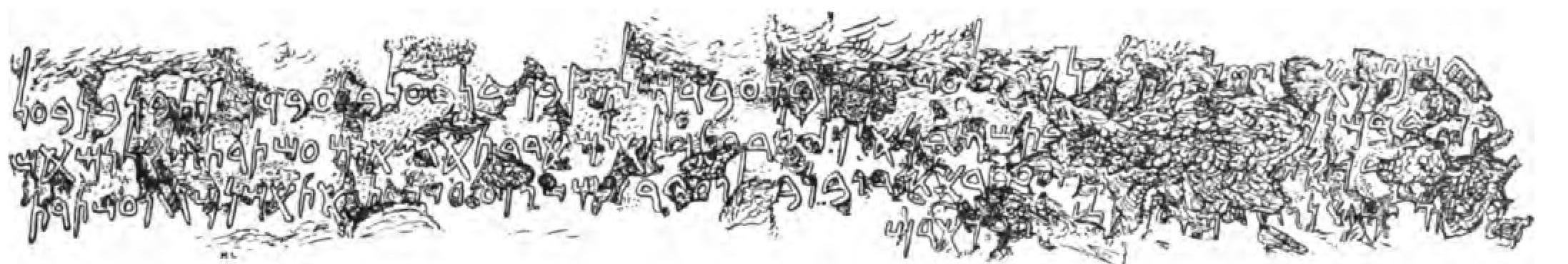
Banobal inscription

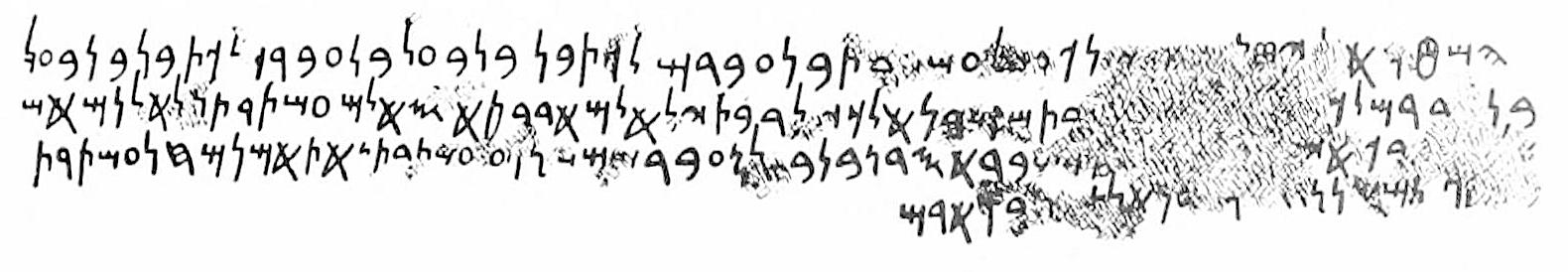
Banobal inscription (Daressy)

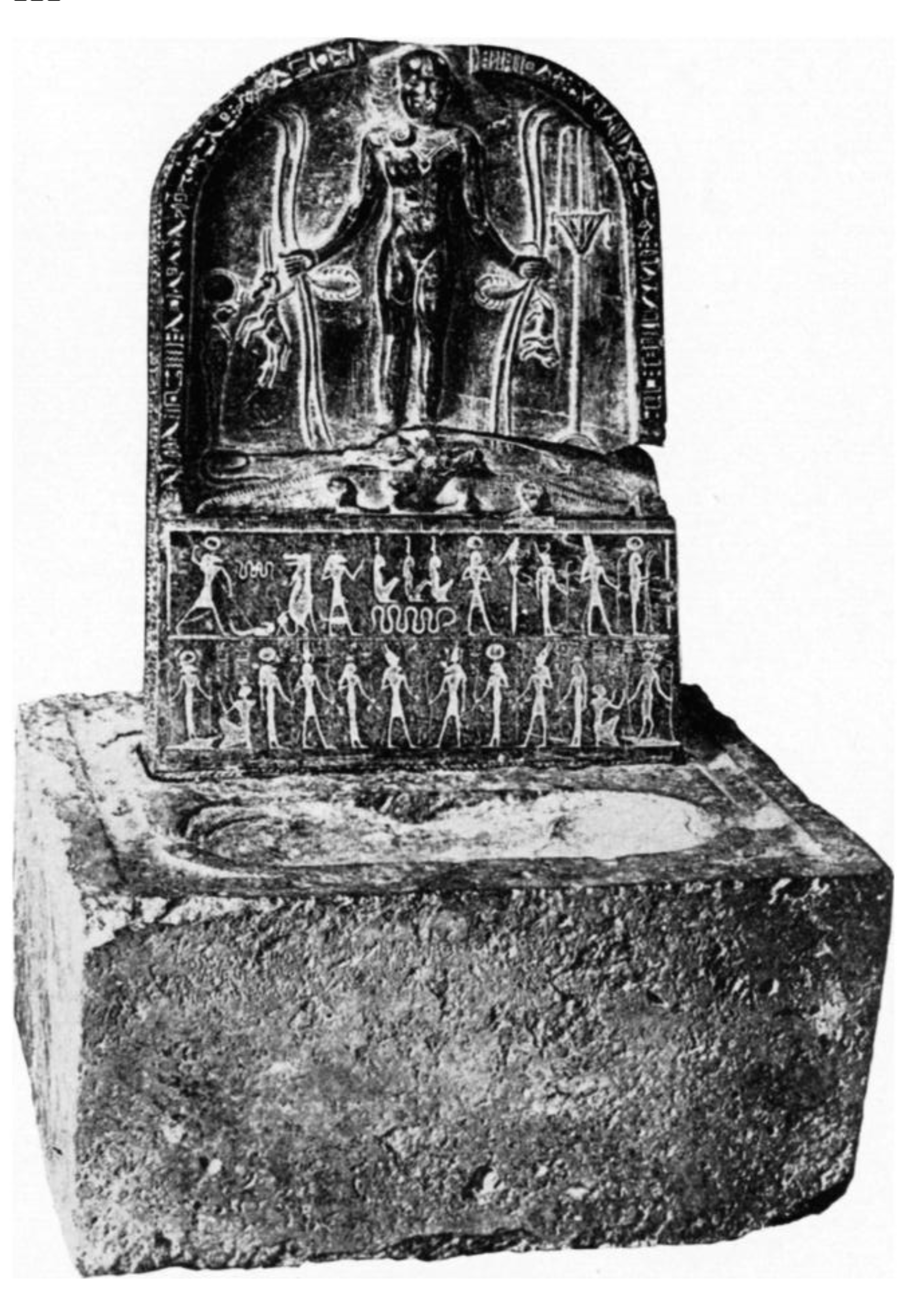
The stele (CG 9402 in the Cairo Museum), showing "Horus on the Crocodiles". The Phoenician inscription of Banobal is on the front of the plinth (not visible at this resolution)

The Banobal stele is a Horus on the Crocodiles stele with a Phoenician graffiti inscription on a block of marble which served as a base for an Egyptian stele, found near the Pyramid of Unas in Memphis, Egypt in 1900. The inscription is known as KAI 48 or RES 1.

It was first mentioned in 1900 by Melchior de Vogüe, who had been sent a copy of the stele by Gaston Maspero, who was excavating Memphis, Egypt.

It is currently at the Egyptian Museum, with ID CG 9402 (JE 33264+34081).

== Phoenician inscription ==
The inscription is the front of the plinth of the stele, which measures 55 x 64 x 32 cm. The text of the inscription is damaged; it has been dated to the 2nd-1st centuries BCE.

The inscription reads according to Krahmalkov:

HMṬN’ [Z] YṬN[’T] ’NK P‘L‘ŠTRT
[This] stele I erect[ed], I, Pa‘ol‘astarte,

BN ‘BDMLKT BN BNB‘L BN ‘BDMLKT BN BNB‘L / BN ‘BDMLK[T
son of ‘Abdmilkot son of Binba‘al son of ‘Abdmilkot son of Binba‘al son of ‘Abdmilko[t,

L...(?)‘ŠT]RT ŠMRN
to ... (?)Ast]arte of Šomrōn (Samaria).

’NKY LRBTY L’LM ’DRT ’M ’LM ‘ŠTRT WL’LNM ’Š/’L
I (ask) of my Lady, the great Goddess, mother, the goddess ‘Astarte, and of the (other) gods, I ask:

[. TB]RK ’Y[TY W’YT B]NY ‘BD’SR WBNB‘L W‘BDŠMŠ WP‘L‘ŠTRT W’T ’MNM ḤN‘ŠTRT
[May you bl]ess m[e and my s]ons — ‘Abdosir and Binba‘al and ‘Abdsemes and Pa‘ol‘astarte —, and their mother Ḥan‘astarte,

[WY]TN LM ḤN WḤYM L‘N ’LNM WBN ’DM
[and may they (the gods) gr]ant them favor and (long) life in the eyes of gods and men (lit. and the sons of man)!

The reading is hard, and RÉS and KAI did not read ŠMRN (Samaria), and read L’LM ’DRT ’S (the great Goddess, Isis).

Charles Clermont-Ganneau suggested the name Binba‘al might be better restored Banoba'al or Hanobal.

Scholars have connected this name to Banobali or Bariobali, a Phoenician temple slave described by Cicero in In Verrem.

== Gallery ==
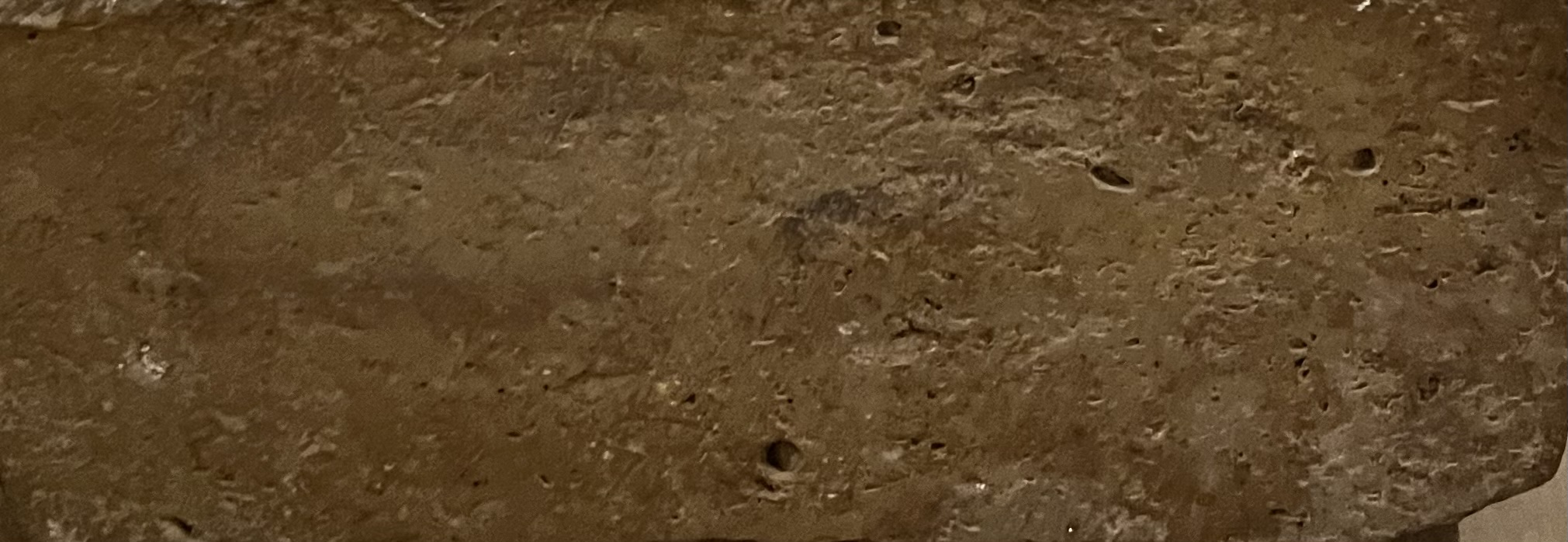
Inscription zoomed in

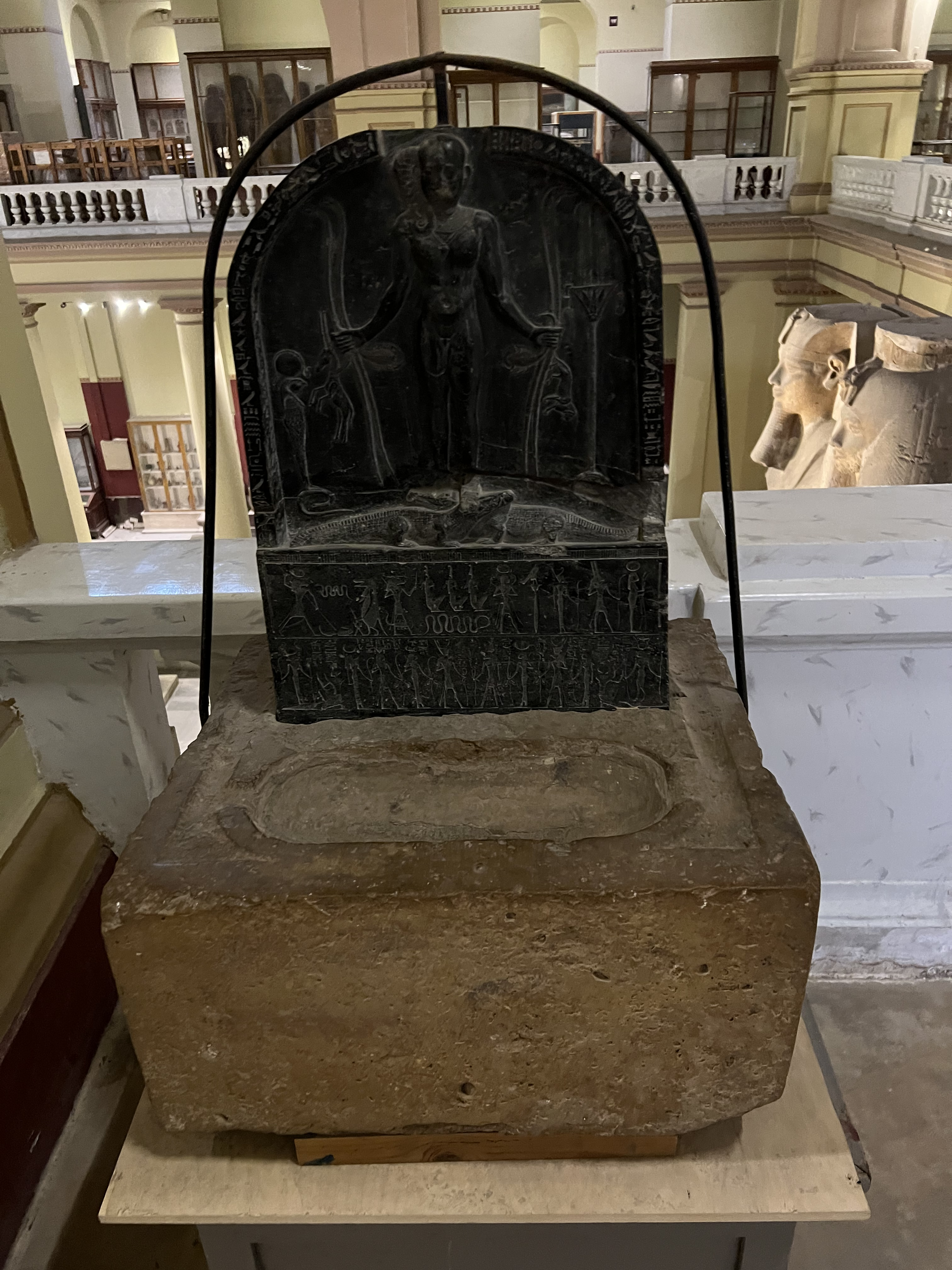
Front

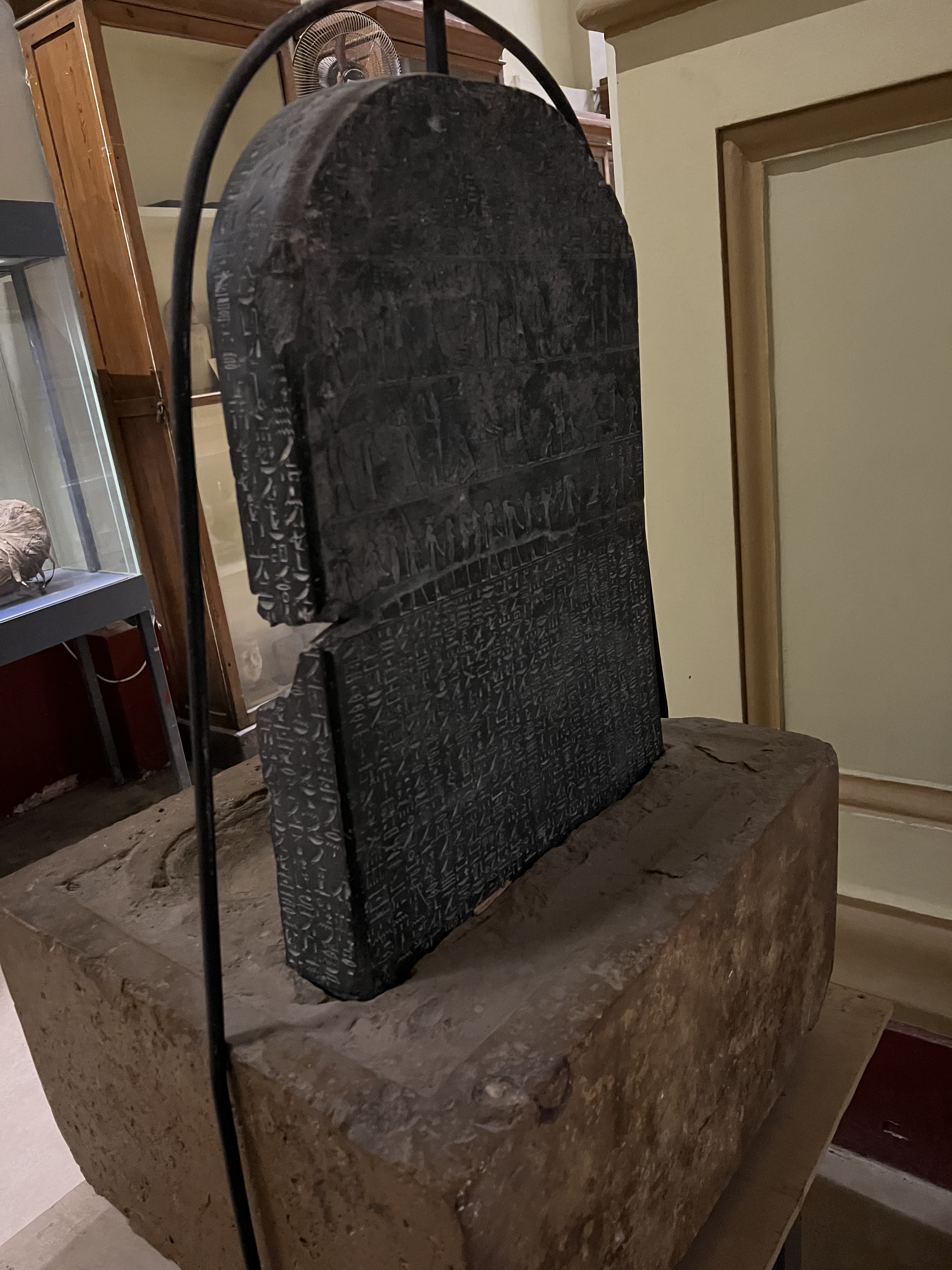
Back

== Bibliography ==
- Daressy, Georges, 1903, Textes et dessins magiques, 9402, pages 3-11 Egypt. Maslahat al-Athar
- Vol 13: Bulletin de l'Institut d'Egypte (1930-1931), page 79
- Vol 21: Bulletin de l'Institut d'Egypte (1938-1939), page 261
