= Jean Mallon =

French palaeographer (1904-1982)

Jean Mallon (French pronunciation: [ʒɑ̃ malɔ̃]; 20 June 1904, in Le Havre – 16 November 1982) was a French palaeographer, specialist of Latin palaeography.

== Career ==
A student at the École Nationale des Chartes, he obtained his archivist-palaeographer degree in 1926. He then was a curator at the Archives nationales.

John Mallon had a major influence on the French school of paleography, introducing and demonstrating the importance of the ductus as dynamic element of the evolution of writings. In the early years of his work, from 1937 to 1939, he retained the traditional theory that wanted all Roman writings were from the capital calligraphy by a regularly continuous transformation processing thereof, but highlighted the problems that this theory raised. He innovated by creating the first palaeographic movie, La lettre, which highlighted the role of successive actions of cursiveness and calligraphy on the morphological transformation of the alphabet. He published, with Robert Marichal, L'écriture latine de la capitale romaine à la minuscule.

After the war, Mallon was the project manager of the "nouvelle paléographie" (new paleography) and published in 1952 the work Paléographie romaine, which organized new concepts of the evolution of writing in a consistent and flawless presentation: the inclination of the support moves the thick and thin strokes and generates a genealogy of various scriptures attested in Roman times that can no longer be seen as a continuous multiple affiliations, but in a pattern that, in outline, must be at least bifurcated.

The thirty years following the Paléographie romaine were those of "exploitation and activism." Because of his originality and his work covering epigraphy, diplomatics, papyrology and codicology, he was considered "the pioneer of the French new school of palaeography".

== Publications ==
=== Books ===
- 1939: Jean Mallon; Robert Marichal; Charles Ferrat. L'écriture latine de la capitale romaine à la minuscule. Arts et métiers graphiques..
- 1952: Jean Mallon. Paléographie romaine, Madrid, Consejo superior de investigaciones científicas, Instituto Antonio de Nebrija de filologia, 189 p. (Scripturae, monumenta et studia, 3).
- 1951: Monsalud, Mariano Cárlos Solano Gálvez de San Pelayo y Villalpando, marquis de. Las Inscripciones publicadas por el marqués de Monsalud (1897-1908). Estudio crítico, éd. Jean Mallon et Tomás Marín, Madrid, Consejo sup. de investig. cient., XXV-135 p. (Scripturae monumenta et studia, 2).
- 1982: Mallon, Jean (1982). De l'écriture : recueil d'études publiées de 1937 à 1981. Éd. du Centre national de la recherche scientifique. ISBN 2-222-02931-7.
- 1986: Mallon, Jean (1982). De l'écriture. Éd. du Centre national de la recherche scientifique. ISBN 2-222-02931-7.
- 1963: Archives nationales (France), Inventaire des archives de la marine. T. 8, Sous-série B3, 561-803, réd. Henri Buche et Jean Mallon, Paris : Impr. nationale.

=== Articles ===
- 1948: Pour une nouvelle critique des chiffres dans les inscriptions latines gravées sur pierre, "Emerita", t. 16, p. 14-45.
- 1949: Quel est le plus ancien exemple connu d'un manuscrit latin en forme de codex ?, "Emerita", t. 17, p. 1-8.
- 1952: La Brique de Villaviciosa de Cordoba, Ps. XCV, 11, in "Studi in onore di Cesare Manaresi", Milano, A. Giuffré, p. 209-216.
- 1955: Une inscription latine incomplètement gravée, "Libyca, Archéologie, Epigraphie", t. 3, p. 155-162
- 1957: Scriptoria épigraphiques, in "Scriptorium", t. 11/2, p. 177-194.
- 1964–1965: Jean Mallon, Charles Perrat, Liste de noms écrits sur marbre, in "Mélanges de Carthage" offerts à Charles Saumagne, Louis Poinssot, Maurice Pinard, Paris : Librairie orientaliste P. Geuthner, p. 135-139.
- 1970: Gilbert Charles-Picard, Henri Le Bonniec, Jean Mallon, Le Cippe de Beccut, in "Antiquités africaines", t. 4, p. 125-164.
- L'Écriture de la chancellerie impériale romaine, "Acta Salmanticensia. Filosofía y letras", t. 4/2
- 1976: Schéma à propos d'une inscription latine publiée dans un recueil récent, "Scriptorium", t. 30, p. 249-251.
- 1977: Panorama actual de la investigacion sobre escrituras latinas : perspectivas para el futuro, in "Actas de las I jornadas de metodologia aplicada de las ciencias historicas, V paleografia y archivistica", Santiago de Compostela : Universidad, p. 15-22.
- 1981: Qu'est-ce que la paléographie ?, communication dactylographiée au "Colloque du Comité international de paléographie", Munich, 15 September.

=== Film ===
Jean Mallon, 'Ductus', director Jean Venard, animation Equipe Arcady, music by Jean Cohen-Solal, conseiller artistique Georges Richar, prod. Les films verts
