= Sanctuary of Demeter and Kore (Syracuse) =

Temple of Demeter and Kore

The Sanctuary of Demeter and Kore was a sanctuary in ancient Syracuse in Sicily, Magna Graecia, dedicated to Demeter and Kore (Persephone).

The sanctuary was founded on the Ortygia in the Piazza Archimede. Numerous female terracotta figurines from the 8th-century BC has been excavated. The sanctuary was moved to the acropolis of Syracuse in the 5th century BC.

The cult of Demeter was benefited by Gelon, tyrant of Syracuse, as a way to unite the Greek population during his expansionism on Sicily. Gelon was the hereditary chief priest of Demeter's cult in Gela, a cult that was popular also in Syracuse and Camarina, and he used the Demeter cult as well as the fight against Carthage to unite Syracuse, Gela and Camarina. After his successful war against Carthage, Gelon used the spoils of war to finance the new sanctuary of Demeter in Syracuse.

The new sanctuary was situated below the Piazza Vittoria in Syracuse. Remains has been found of a large sanctuary including a temple stereobate and the foundations of an altar. A great quantity of votive material has been found on the site. The sanctuary was described by Plato as the location of the city Thesmophoria. The Thesmophoria lasted ten days in Syracuse, in contrast to the three days in Athens.

The festival has been described by Plutarch, as well as by Athenaeus:

"... in Syracuse, on the Day of Consummation at the Thesmophoria, cakes of sesame and honey were moulded in the shape of female pudenda, and called throughout the whole of Sicily mylloi and carried about in honour of the goddesses. "

Gelon spread the cult to Syracuse's dependencies Aetna, Himera and Acrae, and the cult of Demeter and Persephone was to spread throughout all Sicily and become immensely popular in the entire island.
