= Jean-Marie Lassère =

French historian

Jean-Marie Lassère (14 May 1932 – 17 June 2011) was a 20th-century French historian of the Roman world. He was professor of Roman history at the Paul Valéry University, Montpellier III. A specialist in Roman Africa, he was also an epigrapher, author of an important textbook.

== Selected works ==
- Manuel d’épigraphie romaine, Paris : Picard, Antiquité/Synthèses n°8, 2011, 2 vol., 576 et 608 p., 142 ill. (3rd edition reworked and expanded, 1st edit. in 2005).

The chosen title indicates that the book is not only about the Latin inscriptions, but also the Greek inscriptions of the Roman world.

- Bibliographie analytique de l'Afrique antique, t. XX (1986) à XXIX (1995), E.F.R (in collaboration with Yann Le Bohec)
- Bibliographie analytique de l'Afrique antique, Index des fascicules I (1962-1963) à XXVII (1993), (in collaboration with Yann Le Bohec), E.F.R., 1998.
- Vbique Populus : peuplement et mouvements de population dans l'Afrique romaine, de la chute de Carthage à la fin de la dynastie des Sévères (146 aC-235 pC), Paris, 1977.
