= Metternich Stela =

Ancient Egyptian stela

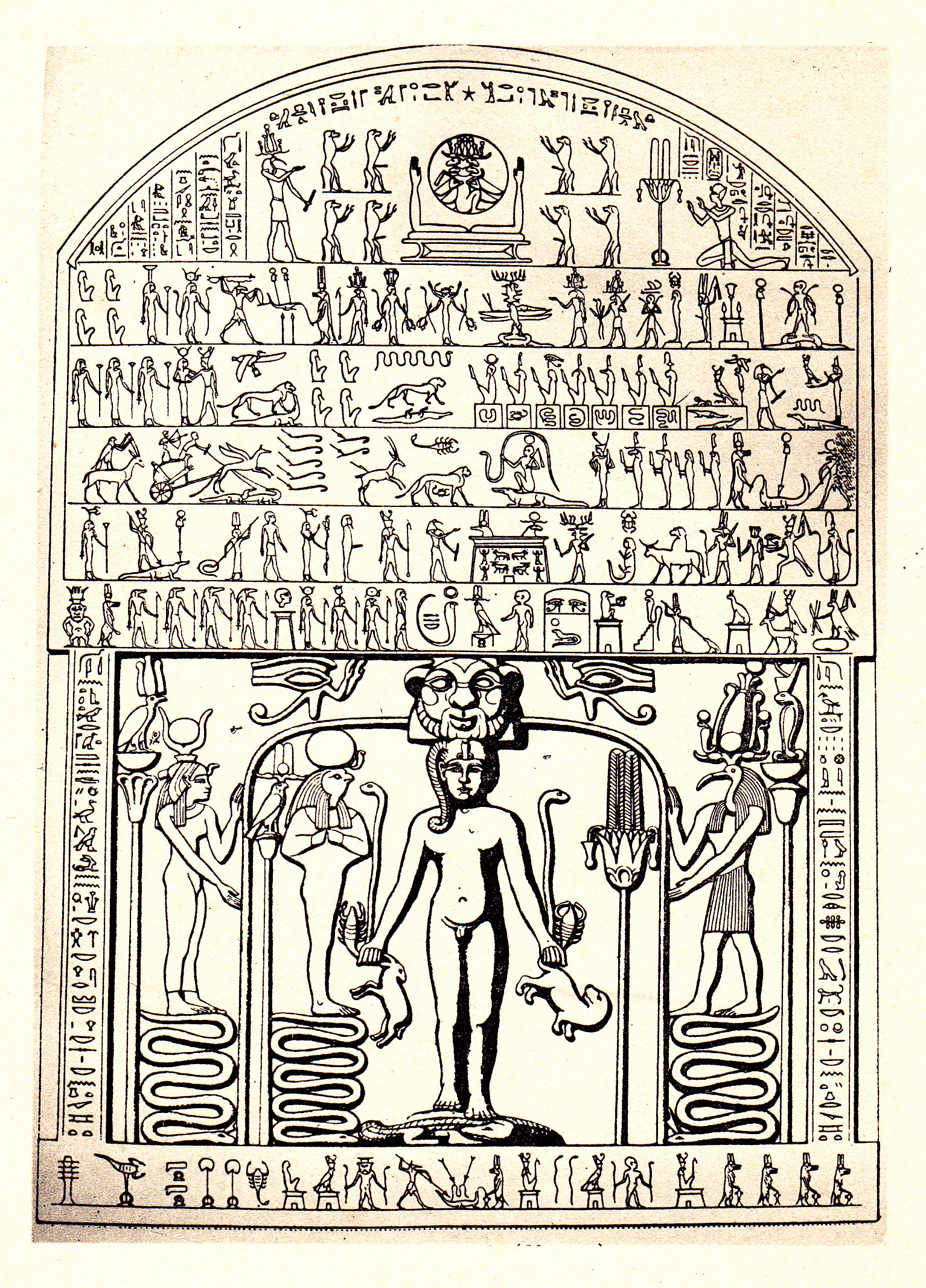
drawing of the upper part of the Recto side of the Metternich Stela

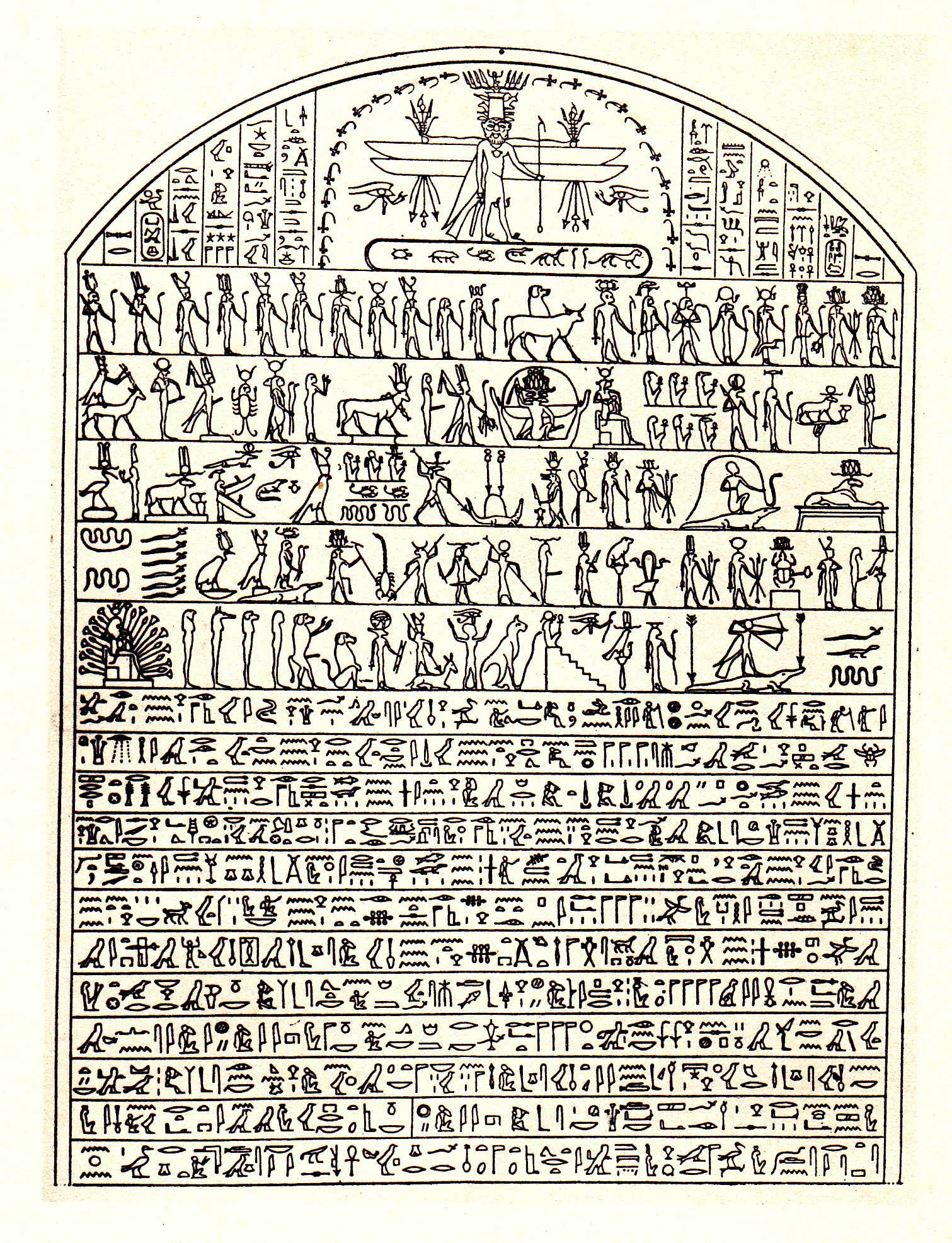
drawing of the upper part of the verso side of the Metternich Stela

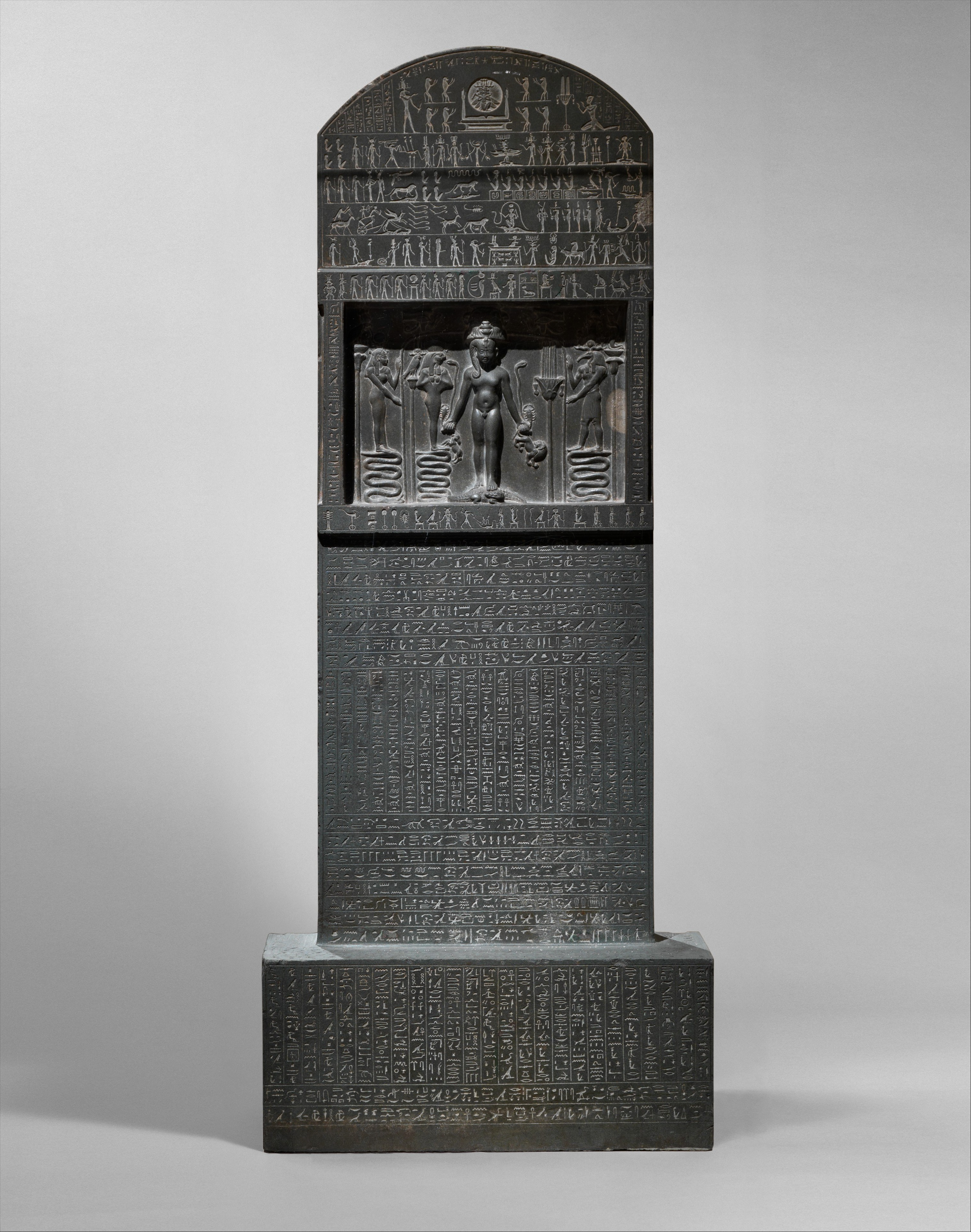
The Metternich Stela

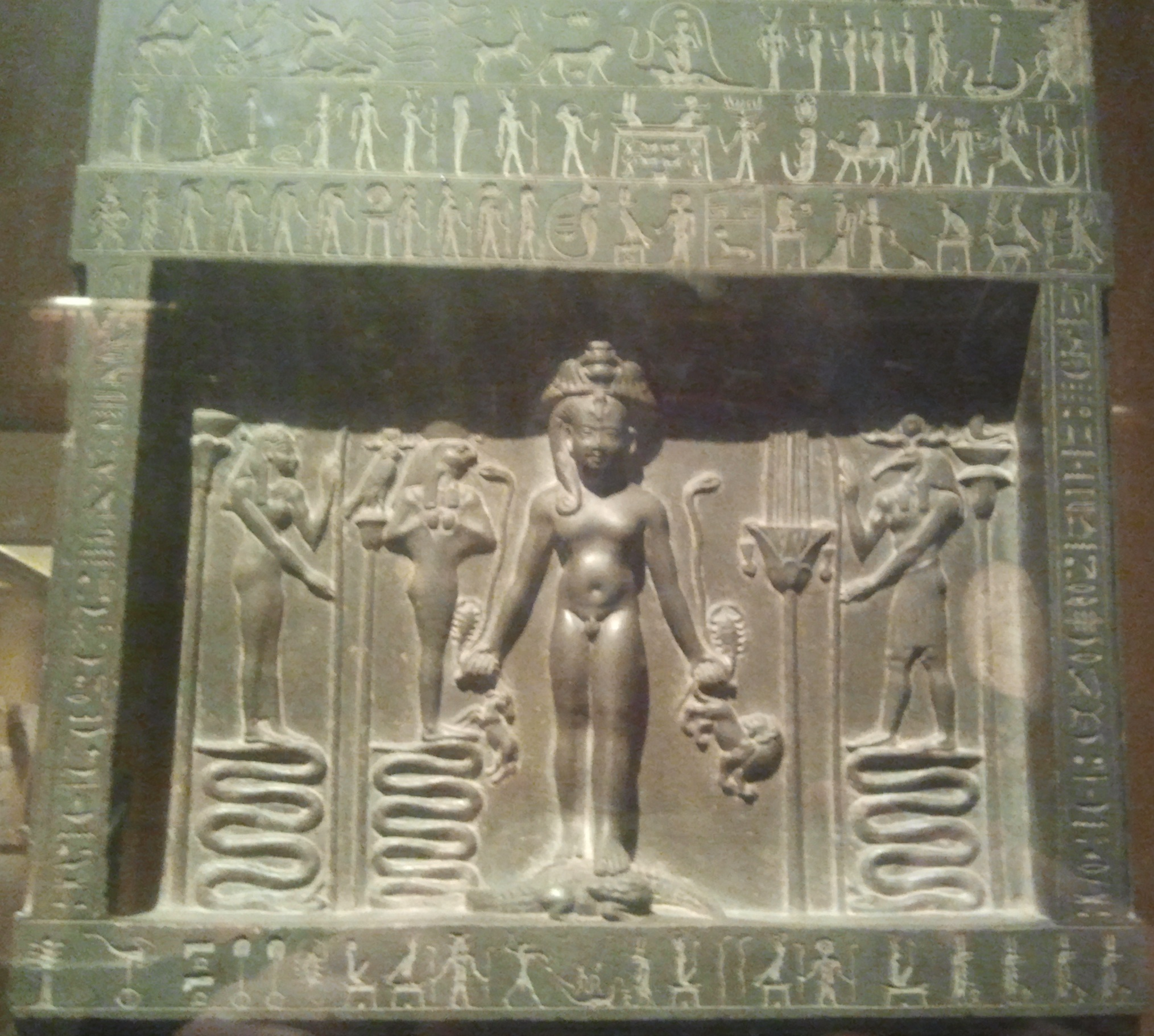
Center panel of the Metternich Stela

The Metternich Stela is a magico-medical Horus on the Crocodiles stele that is part of the Egyptian collection of the Metropolitan Museum of Art in New York City. It dates to the Thirtieth Dynasty of Egypt around 380–342 B.C. during the reign of Nectanebo II. The provenance of the stele is unknown.

== History ==
The stela belongs to a group of stelae known as the "Cippi of Horus" or 'Stelae of Horus on the crocodiles'. These types of stelae were used to protect the ancient Egyptian people from dangerous animals such as crocodiles and snakes. The Magical Stela is one of the largest and most complete of this kind.

It is theorized that in the reign of Nectanebo II, a priest named Esatum traveled to the burial place of the Mnevis bulls at Heliopolis. There he noticed certain inscriptions that he thought were interesting and ordered them to be copied onto a large block of stone. There the stela was created and stood for many years until Alexander the Great conquered the Persians in Egypt and it was brought to Alexandria.

For over two thousand years, the stela was missing until it was discovered in a wall that was excavated in a Franciscan monastery. The stela was then presented to Austrian statesman, Prince Metternich in 1828 by Muhammad Ali Pasha, the ruler of Egypt, and Metternich had stored it in his Kynžvart Castle (in Bohemia) where the stela remained until 1950, being then purchased by the Metropolitan Museum of Art (where it was known for many years as the Metternich Stela).

== Construction ==
The stela is a large block below, (a plinth) connected to a thinner block with a curved top. The dimensions are a height of 35 12/16 inch and a width of 13 ¼ inch. The piece was made from one huge block of fine grained, hard, gray-green stone made from greywacke. The stela is well preserved with only a few small visible chips. It seems to have been created with exact precision and care therefore making it a most intriguing and valuable addition to the Metropolitan Museum of Art.

The top portion of the stela portrays a disk of the sun that identifies Ra, the sun god of the ancient Egyptian religion. On each side of Ra are four baboons. On the far left of the baboons is the messenger god Thoth. On the far right of the baboons is the reigning pharaoh Nectanebo II bowing towards Ra.

The main portion of the relief is separated from the top portion with five lines of hieroglyphs. The center of the stela portrays Horus as a child standing on crocodiles. Above his head is the face of the god Bes, who is the guardian of the newborn and childbirth. Horus is holding in each hand a serpent and scorpion, along with a lion and oryx in either hand.

On the near left of Horus is the god Ra-Horakhty, which is the combination of the two sky gods Horus and Ra, standing on a serpent, and surrounding both of them are two divine symbols. On the far left of the relief is Horus's mother Isis standing upon a serpent, and on her left is the standard of the vulture goddess Nekhbet, patron of the south. On the far right is again the god Thoth standing on a serpent and on his right is the standard of the serpent goddess Wadjet, patron of the north. Above the gods are the eyes of Horus, the sun and the moon.

The rest of the stela is covered with hieroglyphs from top to bottom and also on both sides. These hieroglyphs document the stories of the gods and their experiences with poisonous animals. There are also many curses and spells for different types of sickness caused by these animals. Notable on left side of fourth row is a chariot pulled by a winged oryx called an Akhekh, a symbol of royal might.

Another point of interest with the stela is on the upper portion of the reverse side. There is a winged man who represents the demonic solar god Harmeti. He is standing upon his enemies, which are evil animals enclosed in a circle to prevent their escape.

== Mythology ==
The main function of the Metternich Stela was for the magical healing of poisons, mostly caused by animals. Water was poured over the Stela and collected. The water from the Stela was then drunk by the person suffering from the poisonous ailment. That person would identify with the child Horus who had also suffered such tragedies. During the entire process religious rites from the Stela were recited by local priests.

The first few spells on the stela are related to reptiles and other harmful creatures. The most prominent was the serpent demon Apophis who was the enemy of Ra. The spell forced the serpent to decapitate and burn into pieces. The second half of the spell would force the serpent to vomit and while the priest recited this spell the person inflicted would also vomit freeing their body of the poison.

The next spell was directed towards a cat. The cat contained a bit of a god or goddess and would be able to destroy any sort of poison. The spell asks for Ra to aid the cat in her time of need.

Most of the Stela has inscriptions that describe stories such as the ones above in relation to being poisoned and spells to be cured. The most famous is the story of Isis and the Seven Scorpions. The story takes up the majority of the stela and is most referenced when it came to ailments dealing with poisons.

Isis was the mother of Horus, along with his father Osiris who was the ruler of the living world. Osiris was killed by his brother Set who was incredibly jealous of his power. When Isis and Nephthys discovered this, they brought Osiris back to life with the use of magic. Set was enraged and so he killed Osiris once again, but this time he chopped up his body into many parts and scattered them throughout Egypt. Osiris then became the pharaoh of the dead and the underworld, while the land of the living was ruled by no one.

Set was content thinking he would become the pharaoh of the living, but what he didn't know was that Isis was pregnant with Osiris's child. He would become pharaoh of the living because of his birthright. After Isis gave birth to Horus, it was thought that he would become the new pharaoh of the living, but once Set found out he became very angry.

At this point the actual spell starts on the Magical Stela. Set had the child poisoned by a scorpion, which is often associated with the serpent demon, Apophis. Isis was outraged with grief at the death of her child. She called out to Ra and asked him for his aid. He sent Thoth who restored the child to life. From that point Ra would act as an advocate to Horus, just as his father Osiris would have done if alive.

Horus lived but later fought Set to see who would become the pharaoh of the living. During the fight Set ripped out Horus's eye and won the battle. This is where the symbol 'the Eye of Horus' is from. Set then became the pharaoh of the living once again.

Isis could not stand by and let this happen because her son was the rightful ruler. She went into the underworld disguised and sought out Set. She told him how an evil man took something from her son that was rightfully his. Set ordered to have this corrected, not knowing who she was referring to. Isis revealed herself to Set and he tried to recant, but Ra witnessed the event and made Horus the pharaoh of the living.

The majority of the stela relates to how Horus was poisoned and cured. The ancient Egyptians would also use this cure for their own people who suffered from poisons. The sick would have the spirit of Horus within them and they would be cured just as Horus was. (Egyptian Art) The stories inscribed on this stela, especially the one regarding Isis and Horus are the most comprehensive found on any monument.

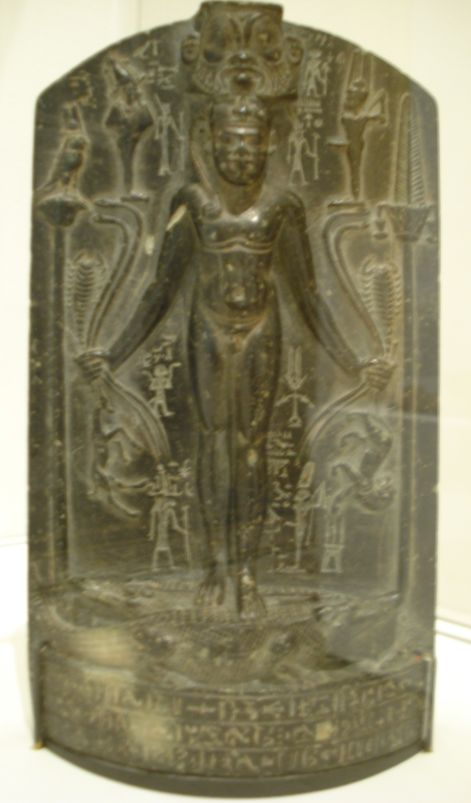
Cippus of Horus stele

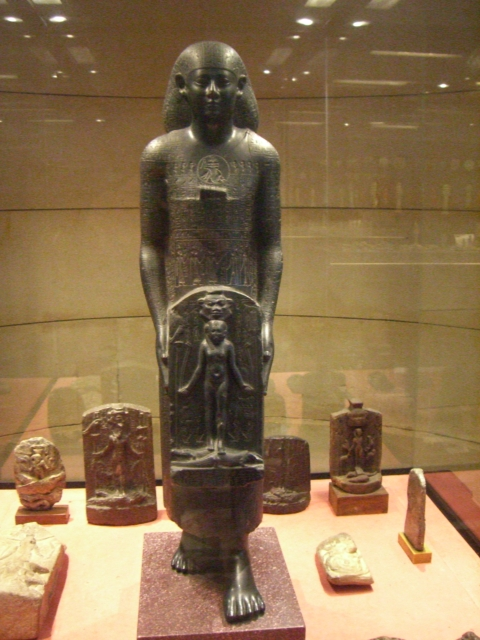
Statue of individual holding a stele: a Cippus of Horus healing statue
