= Apt =

Apt, Apt., or APT may refer to:

== Arts, entertainment and media ==
- "APT." (song), a 2024 song by Rosé and Bruno Mars
- Apt. (film), a 2006 South Korean horror film
- APT Entertainment, a film production company in the Philippines
- Apt Records, a subsidiary record label of ABC-Paramount Records
- Alabama Public Television, a network of PBS member stations in Alabama, U.S.A.
- American Players Theatre, a classical theater located in Spring Green, Wisconsin
- American Public Television, a television program provider in the United States
- Apt., a 2006 album by Chilean singer Nicole
- Apt, a literary journal published by Aforementioned Productions

== Computing and software ==
- APT (programming language) (Automatically Programmed Tool), a high-level computer programming language
- APT (software), Debian's high-level package management system, also used by other Linux-based operating systems
- Almost Plain Text, or Doxia, a wiki-like syntax used mainly by Apache Maven
- Annotation processing tool, a utility for executing annotation processors in the Java programming language
- Advanced persistent threat, a set of stealthy, continuous and especially state-sponsored computer hacking threat actors
- Applied Predictive Technologies, a statistical business analysis software company
- Advanced Programming Techniques Ltd., creators of the Command CICS software product

== Finance ==
- Automated Payment Transaction tax, a proposal to replace all taxes with a single tax on each and every transaction in the economy
- Artist Pension Trust, an investment program designed for artists
- Arbitrage pricing theory, a general theory of asset pricing

== People ==
- Jerome Apt (born 1949), Ph.D., an American astronaut
- Leonard Apt, inventor of the Apt test
- Milburn G. Apt (1924–1956), US test pilot

== Places ==
- Apt Cathedral, a former cathedral, and national monument of France, in the town of Apt in Provence
- Apt, Vaucluse, a commune of the Vaucluse département of France
- Arrondissement of Apt, an arrondissement in the Vaucluse département of France
- Canton of Apt, France

== Science and medicine ==
- Ammonium paratungstate, a tungsten-based chemical compound
- Atom-probe tomography, an atomic-resolution microscopy technique
- Attached proton test, a technique used in carbon-13 nuclear magnetic resonance spectroscopy
- Automatic picture transmission, a weather satellite system
- Anterior pelvic tilt
- Acyl-protein thioesterase, an enzyme family that cleaves cysteine thioesters

== Transportation ==
- Advanced Passenger Train, a tilting passenger train designed and built during the late 1970s by British Rail
- Association for Public Transportation, a Boston-based nonprofit organization
- Australian Pacific Touring, an Australian tour operator

== Others ==
- Apartment, type of housing unit
- Apt (Egyptian), may refer to several deities or to a location in Egypt
- Apt (Martian crater)
- Apt test, a medical test used to differentiate fetal or neonatal blood from maternal blood
- Apt meteorite of 1803, a meteorite which fell in Provence-Alpes-Côte d'Azur, France
- American Perimeter Trail, a proposed trail system in the continental United States
- Animation photo transfer process (APT process), a process used in animation
- Applied Probability Trust, a UK-based non-profit-making foundation for study and research in the mathematical sciences
- APT assault rifle
- ASEAN Plus Three, the Association of Southeast Asian Nations plus China, South Korea, and Japan
- Asia-Pacific Telecommunity, an intergovernmental organisation concerning communications technology
- The Asia Pacific Triennial, a major art exhibition at the Gallery of Modern Art, Brisbane, Australia
- Asian Poker Tour, a major poker tour focusing on the Asia-Pacific region
- Association for Preservation Technology International
- Association for Psychological Therapies, a provider of accreditation and training for mental health professionals

== See also ==
- Apartment (disambiguation)
