= Halston (disambiguation) =

Halston (1932–1990) was an American fashion designer.

Halston may also refer to:

- Halston, Ontario, a community in Tyendinaga, Ontario, Canada
- Halston Hall, a historic country house in Whittington, Shropshire, England
- Halston Preceptory, a monastic house in Shropshire, England
- Halston (miniseries), a 2021 American miniseries based on the life of the fashion designer
- Halston (film), a 2019 American biographical documentary film

== People with the name ==
- Carissa Halston, co-founder of American literary press Aforementioned Productions
- Julie Halston, American actress and comedian
- Mike Halston, drummer for The Slugs
- Rodger Halston, American actor in Carnosaur 3: Primal Species
- Halston Sage (born 1993), American actress
- Halston family, characters in Intimate Strangers
