= Apartment (disambiguation) =

An apartment is a self-contained housing unit that occupies only part of a building.

Apartment may also refer to:

== Film and television ==
=== Films ===
- Apartment (film), a 2010 Bollywood film
- The Apartment, a 1960 American film
- The Apartment (1996 film), a French film directed by Gilles Mimouni
- The Apartment (2023 film), a Paraguayan film directed by Michael Kovich Jr.

=== Television shows ===
- The Apartment (TV series), an Asian reality television series

=== Television episodes ===
- "The Apartment", a 1979 episode of Are You Being Served?
- "The Apartment" (Brooklyn Nine-Nine), a 2014 episode
- "The Apartment", a 1998 episode of Everybody Loves Raymond
- "The Apartment" (Full House), a 1993 episode
- "The Apartment", a 1986 episode of Gimme a Break!
- "The Apartment", a 1977 episode of Happy Days
- "The Apartment", a 1961 episode of Hennesey
- "The Apartment", a 1992 episode of Mad About You
- "The Apartment", a 2003 episode of Married to the Kellys
- "The Apartment", a 1988 episode of Mr. Belvedere
- "The Apartment" (New Girl), a 2016 episode
- "The Apartment", a 1986 episode of Night Court
- "The Apartment", a 2000 episode of Providence
- "The Apartment", a 2012 episode of Retired at 35
- "The Apartment" (Seinfeld), a 1991 episode
- "The Apartment", a 1996 episode of Spin City
- "The Apartment", a 1993 episode of Step by Step
- "The Apartment", a 1979 episode of Taxi
- "The Apartment", a 1967 episode of That Girl
- "The Apartment", a 1962 episode of The Adventures of Ozzie and Harriet
- "The Apartment", a 1986 episode of The Facts of Life
- "The Apartment", a 1983 episode of Three's Company
- "The Apartment", a 1987 episode of What a Country!
- "The Apartment", a 1978 episode of What's Happening!!
- "The Apartment", a 2008 episode of Worst Week

== Music ==
=== Bands and albums ===
- Apartment (band), an English alternative rock band 2005–2010
- The Apartments, an Australian indie band
- The Apartment (album), by Dexter Gordon, 1974

=== Songs ===
- "Apartment" (Kate Miller-Heidke song), 2006
- "Apartment" (Young the Giant song), 2012
- "APT." (song), by Rosé and Bruno Mars, 2024
- "Apartment", by Custard from Wisenheimer, 1995
- "Apartment", by Seaway from Vacation, 2017
- "Apartment", by Shirley Bassey from The Performance, 2009

== Other uses ==
- The Apartment (production company), an Italian production company owned by Fremantle
- Apartment (novel), a 2020 novel by Teddy Wayne
- Apartment, the name of a concept to handle threading in Component Object Model
