= Doxia =

Tool to generate HTML and other formats from markup documents

Doxia is a content generation framework that provides its users with powerful techniques for generating static and dynamic content. Doxia can be used in web-based publishing context to generate static sites, in addition to being incorporated into dynamic content generation systems like blogs, wikis and content management systems. Doxia is now a subproject of Apache Maven which uses it to convert APT (Almost Plain Text) markup documentation into HTML or other formats.

== Description ==
Doxia supports markup languages with simple syntaxes. Lightweight markup languages are used by people who might be expected to read the document source as well as the rendered output. It is used extensively by Maven and it powers the entire documentation system of Maven. It gives Maven the ability to take any document that Doxia supports and output it in any format.

== History ==
Based on the Aptconvert project developed by XMLmind, Doxia was initially hosted by Codehaus, becoming a sub-project of Maven early in 2006.

== Features ==
- Developed in Java
- Easy-to-learn syntax
- Macro support
- Extensible framework
- Support for several markup formats:
  - APT (Almost Plain Text)
  - Confluence
  - FML (FAQ Markup Language)
  - LaTeX
  - RTF
  - TWiki
  - XDoc
  - Markdown
