= Apt (Egyptian) =

Amunet in hieroglyphs
i wp p t G7
jpwt(j)

Apt, in Egyptian, may refer to:

- wpwtj or jpwtj, sometimes called Aput, Ȧp-t, or Ȧpu-t in outdated literature, the Egyptian word for ‘messenger’, sometimes used as an epithet for various gods.
- Ipet, sometimes called Ȧpit, Apt, Apet, Aptu, Epet, Opet, or Ȧpȧpit in outdated literature, a hippopotamus goddess commonly identified with Taweret.
