= XMLmind =

XMLmind XML Editor is a strictly validating, near WYSIWYG, XML editor.

It supports DocBook, Darwin Information Typing Architecture (DITA), MathML and XHTML.

The XXE Standard edition is available free for personal use. There is also a comparatively low-cost Professional Edition.

XMLmind is recommended for working with the O'Reilly Atlas publishing platform.

== See also ==
- XML editor
