= List of The Adventures of Ozzie and Harriet episodes =

The Adventures of Ozzie and Harriet ran from 1952 to 1966 over 14 seasons. It started as a radio show, and for around the first two seasons, the television series ran simultaneously with the radio show. This wholesome family sitcom features the Nelson family, consisting of Ozzie, Harriet, David, and Rick Nelson, and later on David's wife, June Blair, and Rick's wife, Kris Nelson. The earlier seasons feature a pal for Ozzie, the competitive, yet good-natured, Thorny (played by Don Defore). Later seasons also include characters Doc Williams (played by Frank Cady), Joe Randolph (played by Lyle Talbot), Clara Randolph (played by Mary Jane Croft), and Darby (played by Parley Baer).

== Series overview ==
Season	Episodes	Originally released	
Season	Episodes	First released	Last released
1	39	October 3, 1952	June 26, 1953
2	39	September 18, 1953	June 11, 1954
3	28	October 8, 1954	May 27, 1955
4	26	September 23, 1955	June 8, 1956
5	39	October 3, 1956	June 26, 1957
6	35	October 2, 1957	June 11, 1958
7	36	October 1, 1958	June 17, 1959
8	32	October 7, 1959	June 15, 1960
9	33	September 28, 1960	May 10, 1961
10	25	September 28, 1961	April 19, 1962
11	26	September 27, 1962	June 6, 1963
12	25	September 25, 1963	April 1, 1964
13	26	September 16, 1964	March 17, 1965
14	26	September 15, 1965	March 26, 1966

== Episodes ==
=== Season 1 (1952–53) ===
No. overall	No. in season	Title	Original release date
1	1	"The Rivals"	October 3, 1952
2	2	"The Poet"	October 10, 1952
3	3	"The Pills"	October 17, 1952
4	4	"The Fall Guy"	October 24, 1952
5	5	"Halloween Party"	October 31, 1952
6	6	"Riviera Ballet" "The Ballet"	November 7, 1952
7	7	"David, the Babysitter"	November 14, 1952
8	8	"Ricky Goes to a Dance"	November 21, 1952
9	9	"The Day After Thanksgiving"	November 28, 1952
10	10	"Thorny's Gift"	December 5, 1952
11	11	"Harriet's Hairdo"	December 12, 1952
12	12	"The Boys' Christmas Money"	December 19, 1952
13	13	"Late Christmas Gift"	December 26, 1952
14	14	"The Newspaper Write-Up"	January 2, 1953
15	15	"The Basketball Players"	January 9, 1953
16	16	"Stop Worrying"	January 16, 1953
17	17	"The Tuba Incident" "The Tuba"	January 23, 1953
18	18	"Rover Boys"	January 30, 1953
19	19	"Separate Rooms"	February 6, 1953
20	20	"The Valentine Show"	February 13, 1953
21	21	"The Traffic Signal"	February 20, 1953
22	22	"The Dental Receptionist"	February 27, 1953
23	23	"The Speech"	March 6, 1953
24	24	"The Safe Crackers"	March 13, 1953
25	25	"Brother Beesley's Philosophy"	March 20, 1953
26	26	"The Bowling Alley"	March 27, 1953
27	27	"The Orchid and the Violet"	April 3, 1953
28	28	"The Pancake Mix"	April 10, 1953
29	29	"The Whistler's Daughter"	April 17, 1953
30	30	"The Fish Story"	April 24, 1953
31	31	"Night School"	May 1, 1953
32	32	"The Traders"	May 8, 1953
33	33	"Boxing Matches"	May 15, 1953
34	34	"A Door Key for David"	May 22, 1953
35	35	"The Play's the Thing"	May 29, 1953
36	36	"Monetary System"	June 5, 1953
37	37	"Who's Walter?"	June 12, 1953
38	38	"Curiosity"	June 19, 1953
39	39	"Oscillating Ozzie"	June 26, 1953

=== Season 2 (1953–54) ===
No. overall	No. in season	Title	Original release date
40	1	"The New Chairs"	September 18, 1953
41	2	"The Party"	September 25, 1953
42	3	"The Boys' Paper Route"	October 2, 1953
43	4	"Window Pane"	October 9, 1953
44	5	"David's Pipe"	October 16, 1953
45	6	"David's 17th Birthday"	October 23, 1953
46	7	"No Noise"	October 30, 1953
47	8	"The Hustler"	November 6, 1953
48	9	"The Boys' Day"	November 13, 1953
49	10	"The Suggestion Box"	November 20, 1953
50	11	"The Ladder"	November 27, 1953
51	12	"Parental Guidance"	December 4, 1953
52	13	"The Insurance Policy"	December 11, 1953
53	14	"Credit Reference"	December 18, 1953
54	15	"The Miracle"	December 25, 1953
55	16	"The Hunter"	January 1, 1954
56	17	"Ozzie's Night Out"	January 8, 1954
57	18	"The Cameras"	January 15, 1954
58	19	"Courage"	January 22, 1954
59	20	"The Incentive"	January 29, 1954
60	21	"Too Many Children"	February 5, 1954
61	22	"David's Career"	February 12, 1954
62	23	"Harriet Gives a Party"	February 19, 1954
63	24	"An Old Fashioned Remedy"	February 26, 1954
64	25	"Initiation"	March 5, 1954
65	26	"Ricky's Lost Letter"	March 12, 1954
66	27	"Father and Son Tournament"	March 19, 1954
67	28	"Gentlemen David"	March 26, 1954
68	29	"David Writes a Column"	April 2, 1954
69	30	"Over Protection"	April 9, 1954
70	31	"Be on Time"	April 16, 1954
71	32	"An Evening with Hamlet"	April 23, 1954
72	33	"New Neighbor"	April 30, 1954
73	34	"Bird's Nest"	May 7, 1954
74	35	"A Friend of the Family"	May 14, 1954
75	36	"A Tuxedo for David"	May 21, 1954
76	37	"The Painter"	May 28, 1954
77	38	"Operation Economy"	June 4, 1954
78	39	"The Swimming Pool"	June 11, 1954

=== Season 3 (1954–55) ===
No. overall	No. in season	Title	Original release date
79	1	"Wedding Anniversary"	October 8, 1954
80	2	"Too Many Ties"	October 15, 1954
81	3	"The Furnace"	October 22, 1954
82	4	"A Load of Gravel"	October 29, 1954
83	5	"The Usher"	November 12, 1954
84	6	"The Come As You Are Party"	November 19, 1954
85	7	"Wally Dipple's Garage Door"	December 3, 1954
86	8	"Odd Bolt"	December 10, 1954
87	9	"A Matter of Inches"	December 17, 1954
88	10	"The Lost Christmas Gift"	December 24, 1954
89	11	"The Fruitcake"	January 7, 1955
90	12	"The Bloodhound"	January 14, 1955
91	13	"The Missing Sandwiches"	January 21, 1955
92	14	"Individuality"	January 28, 1955
93	15	"The Electric Train"	February 4, 1955
94	16	"A Matter of Principle"	February 11, 1955
95	17	"Career Woman"	February 18, 1955
96	18	"The Girl Who Came to Dinner"	February 25, 1955
97	19	"The Sportscar"	March 11, 1955
98	20	"Ricky's Blind Date"	March 18, 1955
99	21	"Spring Housecleaning"	March 25, 1955
100	22	"The Pajama Game"	April 1, 1955
101	23	"Ricky's Shadow"	April 8, 1955
102	24	"The Witness"	April 15, 1955
103	25	"Ricky's Charge Account"	April 22, 1955
104	26	"The Testimonial"	April 29, 1955
105	27	"Thorny's Piano"	May 6, 1955
106	28	"The Stray Dog"	May 27, 1955

=== Season 4 (1955–56) ===
No. overall	No. in season	Title	Original release date
107	1	"David's Engagement"	September 23, 1955
108	2	"Homemade Ice-Cream"	September 30, 1955
109	3	"Football Hero"	October 7, 1955
110	4	"An Invitation to Dinner"	October 14, 1955
111	5	"Carnation Perfume"	October 21, 1955
112	6	"The Campers"	October 28, 1955
113	7	"The Man Across the Street"	November 11, 1955
114	8	"Music Appreciation"	November 18, 1955
115	9	"A Ball of Tinfoil"	November 25, 1955
116	10	"Wedding Rings"	December 2, 1955
117	11	"The Gay Blade"	December 9, 1955
118	12	"The Eclipse"	December 16, 1955
119	13	"The Gadget"	January 6, 1956
120	14	"Art Studies"	January 13, 1956
121	15	"Volunteer Fireman"	January 20, 1956
122	16	"The Car Mix-up"	January 27, 1956
123	17	"Ricky, the Organizer"	February 3, 1956
124	18	"The Safe Driver"	February 10, 1956
125	19	"Watching Thorny's House"	February 24, 1956
126	20	"Personal Column"	March 9, 1956
127	21	"A Day in Bed"	March 23, 1956
128	22	"Buried Treasure"	March 30, 1956
129	23	"A Beautiful Day"	April 13, 1956
130	24	"Honest Face"	April 20, 1956
131	25	"Harriet's Secret Admirer"	May 25, 1956
132	26	"Re-Dressing Ricky"	June 8, 1956

=== Season 5 (1956–57) ===
No. overall	No. in season	Title	Original release date
133	1	"Kappa Sigma Party"	October 3, 1956
134	2	"Captain Salty and the Submarine"	October 10, 1956
135	3	"Hidden Panel"	October 17, 1956
136	4	"Christmas in October"	October 24, 1956
137	5	"The Banjo Player"	October 31, 1956
138	6	"Fifty Dollar Bill"	November 7, 1956
139	7	"The Pool Table"	November 14, 1956
140	8	"David Picks Up the Tab"	November 21, 1956
141	9	"The Balloons"	November 28, 1956
142	10	"Ricky's Car"	December 5, 1956
143	11	"A Doctor in the House"	December 12, 1956
144	12	"Busy Christmas"	December 19, 1956
145	13	"The Day After Christmas"	December 26, 1956
146	14	"Ozzie's Double"	January 2, 1957
147	15	"A Hairstyle for Harriet"	January 9, 1957
148	16	"The Puppy"	January 16, 1957
149	17	"Borrowed Tuxedo"	January 23, 1957
150	18	"Like Father, Like Son"	January 30, 1957
151	19	"The Duenna"	February 6, 1957
152	20	"The Hot Dog Stand"	February 13, 1957
153	21	"Reading Room"	February 20, 1957
154	22	"The Disbelievers"	February 27, 1957
155	23	"The Clubhouse"	March 6, 1957
156	24	"Jet Pilot"	March 13, 1957
157	25	"Ozzie and Harriet Go to Washington"	March 20, 1957
158	26	"The Editor"	March 27, 1957
159	27	"The Hawaiian Party"	April 3, 1957
160	28	"Ricky, the Drummer"	April 10, 1957
161	29	"The Tommy Brannigan Story"	April 17, 1957
162	30	"Sculpturing Class"	April 24, 1957
163	31	"Ozzie, the Treasurer"	May 1, 1957
164	32	"Ricky's Surprise Party"	May 8, 1957
165	33	"Night Watchman"	May 15, 1957
166	34	"David's Date with Miss Universe"	May 22, 1957
167	35	"Strict Parents"	May 29, 1957
168	36	"The Coffee Table"	June 5, 1957
169	37	"The Fishing Lure"	June 12, 1957
170	38	"Taking Care of Freddy"	June 19, 1957
171	39	"The Loan"	June 26, 1957

=== Season 6 (1957–58) ===
No. overall	No. in season	Title	Original release date
172	1	"Fixing Up the Fraternity House"	October 2, 1957
173	2	"The Man Without a Family"	October 9, 1957
174	3	"Treasurer's Report"	October 16, 1957
175	4	"The Boys Land in Jail"	October 23, 1957
176	5	"Mystery Shopper"	October 30, 1957
177	6	"Ricky's Big Night"	November 6, 1957
178	7	"Free Flowers"	November 13, 1957
179	8	"Ozzie's Triple Banana Surprise"	November 20, 1957
180	9	"Fourteen Mile Hike"	December 4, 1957
181	10	"Tuti-Fruiti Ice-Cream"	December 11, 1957
182	11	"The Christmas Tree Lot"	December 18, 1957
183	12	"Ricky Goes on TV"	December 25, 1957
184	13	"The Trophy"	January 1, 1958
185	14	"Road Race"	January 8, 1958
186	15	"David and the Stewardess"	January 15, 1958
187	16	"The Picture in Rick's Notebook"	January 22, 1958
188	17	"Harriet's Dancing Partner"	January 29, 1958
189	18	"The Safe"	February 5, 1958
190	19	"David and the Men's Club"	February 12, 1958
191	20	"Who is Betty?"	February 19, 1958
192	21	"The Old Band Pavilion"	February 26, 1958
193	22	"The Practical Joker"	March 5, 1958
194	23	"Scavenger Hunt"	March 12, 1958
195	24	"The Dating System"	March 19, 1958
196	25	"Closed Circuit"	March 26, 1958
197	26	"Top Gun"	April 2, 1958
198	27	"The Record Trout"	April 9, 1958
199	28	"The Bachelor"	April 16, 1958
200	29	"Code of Honor"	April 23, 1958
201	30	"Ricky is Micky"	May 7, 1958
202	31	"Rick's Chemistry Grade"	May 14, 1958
203	32	"The Magic of Three"	May 21, 1958
204	33	"The International Set"	May 28, 1958
205	34	"Ozzie and the Bridge Group"	June 4, 1958
206	35	"A Cruise for Harriet"	June 11, 1958

=== Season 7 (1958–59) ===
No. overall	No. in season	Title	Original release date
207	1	"David Loses His Poise"	October 1, 1958
208	2	"David Becomes a Football Coach"	October 8, 1958
209	3	"A Surprise for Clara"	October 15, 1958
210	4	"The Pony"	October 22, 1958
211	5	"Stealing Rick's Girl"	October 29, 1958
212	6	"Ozzie's Daughters"	November 5, 1958
213	7	"Ozzie Spills the Beans"	November 12, 1958
214	8	"Rick's Riding Lessons"	November 19, 1958
215	9	"Harriet Creates a Triangle"	November 26, 1958
216	10	"The Dress Shop"	December 3, 1958
217	11	"The Motorcycle"	December 10, 1958
218	12	"Helpful Neighbor"	December 17, 1958
219	13	"The Runaways"	December 24, 1958
220	14	"Rick's Scientific Date"	January 14, 1959
221	15	"Rick's Dinner Guest"	January 21, 1959
222	16	"Ozzie and the Space Age"	January 28, 1959
223	17	"Jealous Joe Randolph"	February 4, 1959
224	18	"Composite Girl"	February 11, 1959
225	19	"Ozzie's Old Team-mate"	February 18, 1959
226	20	"The Newspaper Interview"	February 25, 1959
227	21	"The Exploding Book"	March 4, 1959
228	22	"Ozzie Changes History"	March 11, 1959
229	23	"The Tent"	March 18, 1959
230	24	"Ricky, the Bullfighter"	March 25, 1959
231	25	"Togetherness"	April 1, 1959
232	26	"The Other Guy's Girl"	April 8, 1959
233	27	"Treasurer's Son"	April 15, 1959
234	28	"Always a Bridegroom"	April 22, 1959
235	29	"Costume Dance"	April 29, 1959
236	30	"Full House"	May 6, 1959
237	31	"The Little Black Box"	May 13, 1959
238	32	"The Buckingham"	May 20, 1959
239	33	"The Girl in the Bowling Alley"	May 27, 1959
240	34	"Darby, the Rockhound"	June 3, 1959
241	35	"Taking Advantage of Harriet"	June 10, 1959
242	36	"Ozzie Plans a Surprise"	June 17, 1959

=== Season 8 (1959–60) ===
No. overall	No. in season	Title	Original release date
243	1	"Sea Captain"	October 7, 1959
244	2	"Ozzie, the Host"	October 14, 1959
245	3	"David, the Law Clerk"	October 21, 1959
246	4	"Who Needs Girls"	October 28, 1959
247	5	"The Rancher's Daughter"	November 4, 1959
248	6	"The Nelsons Decide to Move"	November 11, 1959
249	7	"David, the Sleuth"	November 18, 1959
250	8	"The Gas Station"	November 25, 1959
251	9	"Fathers' Night at the Fraternity House"	December 2, 1959
252	10	"Happy Anniversary"	December 9, 1959
253	11	"Rick Gets Even"	December 16, 1959
254	12	"An Interest for Harriet"	December 30, 1959
255	13	"Ozzie Keeps a Secret"	January 6, 1960
256	14	"David's Car Payments"	January 20, 1960
257	15	"The Circus"	January 27, 1960
258	16	"Rick's English Literature Class"	February 3, 1960
259	17	"The Lockout"	February 10, 1960
260	18	"Uninvited Guests"	February 17, 1960
261	19	"A Trap for Ricky"	February 24, 1960
262	20	"An Interesting Evening"	March 2, 1960
263	21	"Dave Goofs Off"	March 9, 1960
264	22	"Magic Dishes"	March 16, 1960
266	23	"The Professor's Experiment"	March 30, 1960
265	24	"The T-Shirts"	April 6, 1960
267	25	"Missing Husband"	April 13, 1960
268	26	"Bad Day at Blueberry Rock"	April 27, 1960
269	27	"Dave and the Schoolteacher"	May 4, 1960
270	28	"Big Plans for Summer"	May 11, 1960
271	29	"Forgotten Promise"	May 18, 1960
272	30	"Painting the Sorority House"	May 25, 1960
273	31	"No News for Harriet"	June 8, 1960
274	32	"Weekend Vacation"	June 15, 1960

=== Season 9 (1960–61) ===
No. overall	No. in season	Title	Original release date
275	1	"Fraternity Junk Drive"	September 28, 1960
276	2	"David Gets Discouraged"	October 5, 1960
277	3	"Ozzie, the Boat Keeper"	October 12, 1960
278	4	"His Brother's Girl"	October 19, 1960
279	5	"David Gets a Raise"	October 26, 1960
280	6	"The Table and the Painting"	November 2, 1960
281	7	"A Sweater for Rick"	November 9, 1960
282	8	"A Friend in Need"	November 16, 1960
283	9	"David's Almost In-Laws"	November 23, 1960
284	10	"David Hires a Secretary"	November 30, 1960
285	11	"A Lawnmower for Ozzie"	December 7, 1960
286	12	"The Girl in the Emporium"	December 14, 1960
287	13	"A Piano for the Fraternity"	December 21, 1960
288	14	"Rick Counts the Ballots"	December 28, 1960
289	15	"The Girl Who Loses Things"	January 4, 1961
290	16	"Safe Husbands"	January 11, 1961
291	17	"The Lost Briefcase"	January 18, 1961
292	18	"The Chaperones"	January 25, 1961
293	19	"Bowling With the Wives"	February 1, 1961
294	20	"Our Man in Alaska"	February 8, 1961
295	21	"Two Small Boys and a Dog"	February 15, 1961
296	22	"The Boys' Portraits"	February 22, 1961
297	23	"Mr. Kelley's Important Papers"	March 1, 1961
298	24	"Dave's Golf Story"	March 8, 1961
299	25	"Rick's Broken Arm"	March 15, 1961
300	26	"The Little Houseguest"	March 22, 1961
301	27	"Manly Arts"	March 29, 1961
302	28	"A Question of Suits and Ties"	April 5, 1961
303	29	"The Pen and Pencil Set"	April 12, 1961
304	30	"Selling Rick's Drums"	April 19, 1961
305	31	"E.S.P."	April 26, 1961
306	32	"Rick's 21st Birthday"	May 3, 1961
307	33	"Built-In TV Set"	May 10, 1961

=== Season 10 (1961–62) ===
No. overall	No. in season	Title	Original release date
308	1	"The Dancing Lesson"	September 28, 1961
309	2	"The High Cost of Dating"	October 5, 1961
310	3	"The Newlyweds Get Settled"	October 12, 1961
311	4	"The Fraternity Rents Out a Room"	October 19, 1961
312	5	"David Goes Back to Work"	October 26, 1961
313	6	"Ten For the Tigers"	November 2, 1961
314	7	"Rick Grades a Test"	November 9, 1961
315	8	"The Barking Dog"	November 16, 1961
316	9	"Rick Comes to Dinner"	November 30, 1961
317	10	"Trading Stamps"	December 7, 1961
318	11	"Ricky the Milkman"	December 14, 1961
319	12	"The Fraternity Pin"	January 4, 1962
320	13	"The Backyard Pet Show"	January 11, 1962
321	14	"The Special Cake"	January 18, 1962
322	15	"The Randolph's Niece"	January 25, 1962
323	16	"A Lamp For Dave and June"	February 1, 1962
324	17	"Fraternity Cook"	February 8, 1962
325	18	"Operation Barry"	February 15, 1962
326	19	"Making Wally Study"	February 22, 1962
327	20	"Lending Money to Wally"	March 8, 1962
328	21	"Lonesome Parents"	March 15, 1962
329	22	"The Client's Daughter"	March 29, 1962
330	23	"The Student Nurse"	April 5, 1962
331	24	"Barry's Birthday"	April 12, 1962
332	25	"Little Handprints in the Sidewalk"	April 19, 1962

=== Season 11 (1962–63) ===
No. overall	No. in season	Title	Original release date
333	1	"Rick and the Maid of Honor"	September 27, 1962
334	2	"Miss Bradford's Recipe"	October 4, 1962
335	3	"The Apartment"	October 11, 1962
336	4	"Rick and the Sculptress"	October 18, 1962
337	5	"Trip to Mexico"	October 25, 1962
338	6	"The Tigers Go to a Dance"	November 1, 1962
339	7	"The Women's Club Play"	November 8, 1962
340	8	"Rick Sends a Picture"	November 15, 1962
341	9	"Rick, the Host"	November 22, 1962
342	10	"Losing Miss Edwards"	November 29, 1962
343	11	"An Old Friend of June's"	December 13, 1962
344	12	"Game Inventors"	December 27, 1962
345	13	"Rick and the Boat Model"	January 3, 1963
346	14	"June and the Great Outdoors"	January 10, 1963
347	15	"The Girl at the Ski-Lodge"	January 17, 1963
348	16	"Roadside Courtesy"	January 31, 1963
349	17	"Dave and the Teenager"	February 7, 1963
350	18	"The Adventurers"	February 14, 1963
351	19	"The Goat"	February 28, 1963
352	20	"Any Date in a Storm"	March 7, 1963
353	21	"Decorating Dave's Office"	March 21, 1963
354	22	"Publicity for the Fraternity"	March 28, 1963
355	23	"The Women's Club Bazaar"	April 4, 1963
356	24	"Dave's Law Office"	April 11, 1963
357	25	"Dave and the Fraternity Lease"	April 18, 1963
358	26	"The Music Festival"	June 6, 1963

=== Season 12 (1963–64) ===
No. overall	No. in season	Title	Original release date
359	1	"Torn Dress"	September 18, 1963
360	2	"Secret Agent"	September 25, 1963
361	3	"Ozzie, Joe, and the Fashion Models"	October 2, 1963
362	4	"Rick's Wedding Ring"	October 9, 1963
363	5	"Getting Wally in Shape"	October 16, 1963
364	6	"Blue Moose"	October 23, 1963
365	7	"David Takes a Client to Dinner"	October 30, 1963
366	8	"Wally's Pen-Pal"	November 6, 1963
367	9	"The Lawyers' Convention"	November 13, 1963
368	10	"Money Watchers"	November 20, 1963
369	11	"June Is Always Late"	November 27, 1963
370	12	"Ozzie's Hidden Trophy"	December 4, 1963
371	13	"Rick Makes a Loan"	December 11, 1963
372	14	"David and the Mermaid"	December 18, 1963
373	15	"The Swami"	January 8, 1964
374	16	"Getting Together with the Boys"	January 15, 1964
375	17	"Rick's Wedding Picture"	January 22, 1964
376	18	"A Wife in the Office"	February 5, 1964
377	19	"The Dean's Birthday"	February 12, 1964
378	20	"The Uniforms"	February 19, 1964
379	21	"Wally's TV Set"	February 26, 1964
380	22	"Hayride"	March 11, 1964
381	23	"Rick, the Law Clerk"	March 18, 1964
382	24	"Rick Is Late for Dinner"	March 25, 1964
383	25	"A Letter About Harriet"	April 1, 1964

=== Season 13 (1964–65) ===
No. overall	No. in season	Title	Original release date
384	1	"Rick and the Girl Across the Hall"	September 16, 1964
385	2	"Rick's Old Printing Press"	September 23, 1964
386	3	"The Study System"	September 30, 1964
387	4	"Rick and Kris Go to the Mountains"	October 7, 1964
388	5	"A Letter of Recommendation"	October 14, 1964
389	6	"Kris Goes to College"	October 21, 1964
390	7	"The Pennies"	October 28, 1964
391	8	"The Ballerina"	November 4, 1964
392	9	"A Bedtime Story"	November 11, 1964
393	10	"Harriet's Quiz"	November 18, 1964
394	11	"Kris Plays Cupid"	November 25, 1964
395	12	"A Helpless Female"	December 2, 1964
396	13	"Exotic Housemother"	December 9, 1964
397	14	"Chess Set"	December 16, 1964
398	15	"Cafe Caper"	December 30, 1964
399	16	"The Petition"	January 6, 1965
400	17	"Dave, the Fraternity Advisor"	January 13, 1965
401	18	"Rick Grows a Beard"	January 20, 1965
402	19	"The Big Dog"	January 27, 1965
403	20	"The Trunk"	February 3, 1965
404	21	"Kris' Girlfriend"	February 10, 1965
405	22	"Rick's Raise"	February 17, 1965
406	23	"Breakfast for Harriet"	February 24, 1965
407	24	"The Desk Photo"	March 3, 1965
408	25	"The Early Rush Party"	March 10, 1965
409	26	"A Painting from the Past"	March 17, 1965

=== Season 14 (1965–66) ===
Filmed in color.

No. overall	No. in season	Title	Original release date
410	1	"The Tangled Web"	September 15, 1965
411	2	"A Rose a Day"	September 22, 1965
412	3	"Kris and the Queen"	September 29, 1965
413	4	"Helpful June"	October 6, 1965
414	5	"The Prowler"	October 13, 1965
415	6	"The Nelsons Revisited"	October 20, 1965
416	7	"The Secret Passage"	October 27, 1965
417	8	"Wally, the Author"	November 3, 1965
418	9	"A Message from Kris"	November 10, 1965
419	10	"Flying Down to Lunch"	November 17, 1965
420	11	"The Equestrians"	November 24, 1965
421	12	"Dave, the Worrier"	December 1, 1965
422	13	"Ghost Town"	December 8, 1965
423	14	"David Picks a Pie"	December 15, 1965
424	15	"Kris, the Little Helper"	January 5, 1966
425	16	"Sheik of Araby"	January 15, 1966
426	17	"Wally's Traffic Ticket"	January 22, 1966
427	18	"An Honor for Oz"	January 29, 1966
428	19	"The Hong Kong Suit"	February 5, 1966
429	20	"Ozzie A Go-Go"	February 12, 1966
430	21	"The Trip Trap"	February 19, 1966
431	22	"Waiting for Joe"	February 26, 1966
432	23	"Rick's Assistant"	March 5, 1966
433	24	"Dave's Other Office"	March 12, 1966
434	25	"Ozzie the Sitter"	March 19, 1966
435	26	"The Game Room"	March 26, 1966
