= Apartment (band) =

English four-piece alternative rock band

- Origin: London, England
- Genres: Alternative rock
- Years active: 2005–2010
- Labels: Filthy Lucre, Fleet Street
- Past members: David Caggiari; Tom Gillet; Davide DeSantis; Liam Fletcher

Apartment was an English four-piece alternative rock band from London. They formed in 2005 and were signed to Filthy Lucre and Fleet Street Records. The band toured with The Bravery, Delays, Editors, Jimmy Eat World and British Sea Power amongst others. They also appeared on a co-headline tour of France with The Kooks. They shared many stages with fellow East-Londoners Boy Kill Boy. They released their debut album, The Dreamer Evasive, in 2007. The song from the album "Fall Into Place" was also selected to be featured in the video game by EA Sports, FIFA 08, as well as in the first-season episode of Chuck, "Chuck Versus the Wookiee".

== History ==
Apartment consisted of David Caggiari on vocals, guitar and keyboards; Thomas Gillet on bass; Liam Fletcher on drums; and Davide De Santis on guitar. The band came together in Bethnal Green in east London, sharing loves of influential acts like Blonde Redhead, Velvet Underground, Jeff Buckley, David Bowie, The Associates and Bruce Springsteen. Apartment released two early singles on Fierce Panda, "Everyone Says I'm Paranoid"/"June July" and "Patience Is Proving". After these limited releases, the band recorded their debut album The Dreamer Evasive, as well as setting up Fleet Street Records.

Apartment went on to release seven singles and an album, playing all over Europe and the US, featuring at SXSW in Texas, CMJ in New York, Musexpo in Los Angeles and supporting The Killers, The Bravery, Happy Mondays, British Sea Power, Editors, Delays, Jimmy Eat World, Infadels, Towers of London, and a French co-headline tour with The Kooks.

Apartment received various critical acclaim for their debut album The Dreamer Evasive, including one of the 'Best Albums of 2007' by Newsweek magazine and one of the 'Best Pop Songs of 2007' by The Times with the song "Fall into Place".

In late 2010, Caggiari posted a blog post on the band's MySpace profile explaining the band's past and that Apartment was no longer together. He then worked with a band called Age of Giants, which released its first video in April 2013. In March 2014 Age Of Giants released their first album, sold directly by the band, entitled The Wolves Of Winter. Currently David Caggiari works for education first and gives tours of Europe to students. On his side guitarist Davide De Santis started a new music project in 2012 called |dds|. In a year, he formed his full band. After gigging around London, they got into the studio and started recording their first album.

== Discography ==
=== Albums ===
Title	Release date
The Dreamer Evasive	5 March 2007

=== Singles ===
Title	Release date	Chart position
"Everyone Says I'm Paranoid" / "June July"	7 February 2005	UK No. 67
"Patience Is Proving"	4 July 2005	UK No. 84
"I'll Play With Yours If You Play With Mine"	27 March 2006	-
"My Brother Chris"	31 July 2006	-
"10,000 Times"	23 October 2006	UK No. 140
"Pressures"/"Ghost Of An Unforgivable Past"	26 February 2007	-
"Fall into Place"	11 June 2007	-
