= Association for Public Transportation =

American nonprofit organization

The Association for Public Transportation is a nonprofit organization founded in 1973 to encourage development of effective, accessible, and affordable public transport solutions in Boston, Massachusetts, and throughout the northeastern region of the United States. In 1977, the organization started authoring the transit guidebook, Car-Free in Boston, whose last edition was 10th (2003) edition. The organization works with the National Association of Railroad Passengers and the US High Speed Rail Association.

APT merged into transit advocacy group TransitMatters on December 28, 2023.
