= Aforementioned Productions =

- Type: Literary, Theatrical
- Founded: Massachusetts, US (2005)
- Headquarters: Boston
- Key people: Carissa Halston, Randolph Pfaff
- Website: aforementionedproductions.com

Aforementioned Productions is an American independent production company and small press, founded in early 2005 by poet Randolph Pfaff and writer Carissa Halston.

Their literary journal, apt, was published online through 2010, but moved to a hybrid print/online format in 2011. Current staff of apt includes Carissa Halston (Editor-in-Chief), Randolph Pfaff (Senior Editor), and Molly Mary McLaughlin (Assistant Editor). From 2010–2014, they produced Literary Firsts, a quarterly multi-genre reading series in Cambridge, Massachusetts. In 2014, Aforementioned began publishing full-length collections of fiction, essays, and poems.

== Theatrical productions ==
- Cleavage (Boston, September 2005)
- Portraiture (New York, Philadelphia, St. Louis, Toronto, Boston, September 2009)
- The Daughters, a staged reading for the Dorchester Fringe Festival (Boston, May 2013)
- White Rabbit Red Rabbit by Nassim Soleimanpour at OBERON (Cambridge, November 2016)
- Marathon reading of It Can't Happen Here by Sinclair Lewis at Brookline Booksmith (Brookline, March–April 2017)

== Reading series ==
- Literary Firsts (Cambridge, MA, 2010-2014)

== Publications ==
- apt, literary journal (2005-) ISSN 2159-2446 (print), ISSN 1555-9505 (online)
- They Used to Dance on Saturday Nights by Gillian Devereux (August 2011) ISBN 978-0-9823741-4-6
- Underlife and Portico by Michael Lynch (2nd ed - March 2013) ISBN 978-0-9823741-8-4, (1st ed - August 2009) ISBN 978-0-9823741-0-8
- That's When the Knives Come Down by Dolan Morgan (August 2014) ISBN 978-1-941143-00-1
- Afforded Permanence by Liam Day (December 2014) 978-1-941143-01-8
- Anatomies by Susan McCarty (June 2015) ISBN 978-1-941143-03-2
- How Her Spirit Got Out by Krysten Hill (December 2016) ISBN 978-1-941143-08-7

== Awards ==
- Underlife and Portico by Michael Lynch - Recipient of the 2013 Jean Pedrick Chapbook Prize from The New England Poetry Club
- Afforded Permanence by Liam Day - Finalist for the 2015 Massachusetts Book Award in Poetry
- How Her Spirit Got Out by Krysten Hill - Recipient of the 2017 Jean Pedrick Chapbook Prize from The New England Poetry Club
