= Worship of heavenly bodies =

Worship of stars and other heavenly bodies as deities

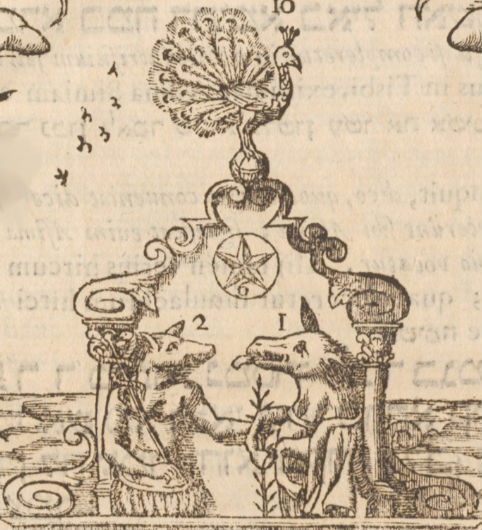
The Star of Remphan, deemed an object of idolatrous worship by Saint Stephen. Cropped "Delubrum Samaritanum", emblem of the Samaritan cult. From Egyptian Oedipus, by Athanasius Kircher, 1652.

The worship of heavenly bodies is the veneration of stars (individually or together as the night sky), the planets, or other astronomical objects as deities, or the association of deities with heavenly bodies. In anthropological literature, these systems of practice may be referred to as astral cults.

The most notable instances of this are sun gods and moon gods in polytheistic systems worldwide. Also notable are the associations of the planets with deities in Sumerian religion, and hence in Babylonian, Greek and Roman religion, viz. Mercury, Venus, Mars, Jupiter, and Saturn. Gods, goddesses, and demons may also be considered personifications of astronomical phenomena such as lunar eclipses, planetary alignments, and apparent interactions of planetary bodies with stars. The Sabians of Harran, a poorly understood pagan religion that existed in Harran during the early Islamic period (7th–10th century), were known for their astral cult.

The related term astrolatry usually implies polytheism. Some Abrahamic religions prohibit astrolatry as idolatrous. Pole star worship was also banned by imperial decree in Heian period Japan.

== Etymology ==
Astrolatry has the suffix -λάτρης, itself related to λάτρις latris 'worshipper' or λατρεύειν latreuein 'to worship' from λάτρον latron 'payment'.

== In historical cultures ==
=== Mesopotamia ===
Mesopotamia is worldwide the place of the earliest known astronomer and poet by name: Enheduanna, Akkadian high priestess to the lunar deity Nanna/Sin and princess, daughter of Sargon the Great (c. 2334 – c. 2279 BCE). She had the Moon tracked in her chambers and wrote poems about her divine Moon. The crescent depicting the Moon as with Enheduanna's deity Nanna/Sin have been found from the 3rd millennium BCE.

Babylonian astronomy from early times associates stars with deities, but the identification of the heavens as the residence of an anthropomorphic pantheon, and later of monotheistic God and his retinue of angels, is a later development, gradually replacing the notion of the pantheon residing or convening on the summit of high mountains. Archibald Sayce (1913) argues for a parallelism of the "stellar theology" of Babylon and Egypt, both countries absorbing popular star-worship into the official pantheon of their respective state religions by identification of gods with stars or planets.

The Chaldeans, who came to be seen as the prototypical astrologers and star-worshippers by the Greeks, migrated into Mesopotamia c. 940–860 BCE. Astral religion does not appear to have been common in the Levant prior to the Iron Age, but becomes popular under Assyrian influence around the 7th-century BCE. The Chaldeans gained ascendancy, ruling Babylonia from 608 to 557 BCE. The Hebrew Bible was substantially composed during this period (roughly corresponding to the period of the Babylonian captivity).

=== Egypt ===
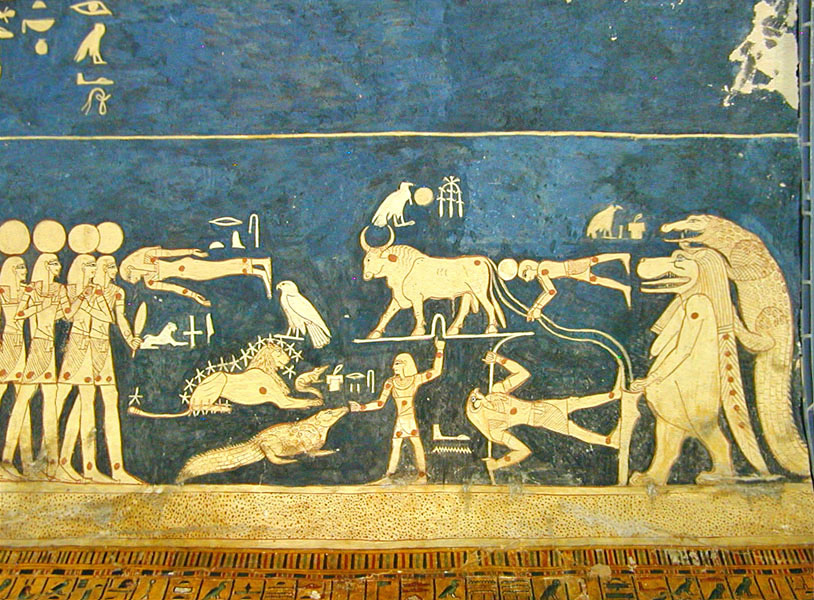
The Ikhemu-sek, a group of ancient Egyptian deities who were the personifications of the northern constellations

Astral cults were probably an early feature of religion in ancient Egypt. Evidence suggests that the observation and veneration of celestial bodies played a significant role in Egyptian religious practices, even before the development of a dominant solar theology. The early Egyptians associated celestial phenomena with divine forces, seeing the stars and planets as embodiments of gods who influenced both the heavens and the earth. Direct evidence for astral cults, seen alongside the dominant solar theology which arose before the Fifth Dynasty, is found in the Pyramid Texts. These texts, among the oldest religious writings in the world, contain hymns and spells that not only emphasize the importance of the Sun God Ra but also refer to stars and constellations as powerful deities that guide and protect the deceased Pharaoh in the afterlife.

The growth of Osiris devotion led to stars being called "followers" of Osiris. They recognized five planets as "stars that know no rest", interpreted as gods who sailed across the sky in barques: Sebegu (perhaps a form of Set), Venus ("the one who crosses"), Mars ("Horus of the horizon"), Jupiter ("Horus who limits the two lands"), and Saturn ("Horus bull of the heavens").

One of the most significant celestial deities in ancient Egyptian religion was the goddess Sopdet, identified with the star Sirius. Sopdet's rising coincided with the annual flooding of the Nile, a crucial event that sustained Egyptian agriculture. The goddess was venerated as a harbinger of the inundation, marking the beginning of a new agricultural cycle and symbolizing fertility and renewal. This connection between Sopdet and the Nile flood underscores the profound link between celestial phenomena and earthly prosperity in ancient Egyptian culture. She was known to the Greeks as Sothis. The significance of Sirius in Egyptian religion is further highlighted by its association with the goddess Isis during later periods, particularly in the Ptolemaic era, where Isis was often depicted as the star itself.

Sopdet is the consort of Sah, the personified constellation of Orion near Sirius. Their child Venus was the hawk god Sopdu, "Lord of the East". As the bringer of the New Year and the Nile flood, she was associated with Osiris from an early date and by the Ptolemaic period Sah and Sopdet almost solely appeared in forms conflated with Osiris and Isis. Additionally, the alignment of architectural structures, such as pyramids and temples, with astronomical events reveals the deliberate integration of cosmological concepts into Egypt's built environment. For example, the Great Pyramid of Giza is aligned with the cardinal points, and its descending passage is aligned with the star Thuban in the constellation Draco, which was the pole star at the time. This alignment likely served both symbolic and practical purposes, connecting the Pharaoh's eternal journey with the stars.

=== Sabians ===
Among the various religious groups which in the 9th and 10th centuries CE came to be identified with the mysterious Sabians mentioned in the Quran (sometimes also spelled 'Sabaeans' or 'Sabeans', but not to be confused with the Sabaeans of South Arabia), at least two groups appear to have engaged in some kind of star worship.

By far the most famous of these two are the Sabians of Harran, adherents of a Hellenized Semitic pagan religion that had managed to survive during the early Islamic period in the Upper Mesopotamian city of Harran. They were described by Syriac Christian heresiographers as star worshippers. Most of the scholars and courtiers working for the Abbasid and Buyid dynasties in Baghdad during the ninth–eleventh centuries who were known as 'Sabians' were either members of this Harranian religion or descendants of such members, most notably the Harranian astronomers and mathematicians Thabit ibn Qurra (died 901) and al-Battani (died 929). There has been some speculation on whether these Sabian families in Baghdad, on whom most of our information about the Harranian Sabians indirectly depends, may have practiced a different, more philosophically inspired variant of the original Harranian religion. However, apart from the fact that it contains traces of Babylonian and Hellenistic religion, and that an important place was taken by planets (to whom ritual sacrifices were made), little is known about Harranian Sabianism. They have been variously described by scholars as (neo)-Platonists, Hermeticists, or Gnostics, but there is no firm evidence for any of these identifications. (Note: On the Sabians of Harran, see further Dozy & de Goeje (1884); Margoliouth (1913); Tardieu (1986); Tardieu (1987); Peters (1990); Green (1992); Fahd (1960–2007); Strohmaier (1996); Genequand (1999); Elukin (2002); Stroumsa (2004); De Smet (2010).)

Apart from the Sabians of Harran, there were also various religious groups living in the Mesopotamian Marshes who were called the 'Sabians of the Marshes' (Arabic: Ṣābiʾat al-baṭāʾiḥ). Though this name has often been understood as a reference to the Mandaeans, there was in fact at least one other religious group living in the marshlands of Southern Iraq. This group still held on to a pagan belief related to Babylonian religion, in which Mesopotamian gods had already been venerated in the form of planets and stars since antiquity. According to Ibn al-Nadim, our only source for these star-worshipping 'Sabians of the Marshes', they "follow the doctrines of the ancient Aramaeans [ʿalā maḏāhib an-Nabaṭ al-qadīm] and venerate the stars". However, there is also a large corpus of texts by Ibn Wahshiyya (died c. 930), most famously his Nabataean Agriculture, which describes at length the customs and beliefs — many of them going back to Mesopotamian models — of Iraqi Sabians living in the Sawād.

=== China ===
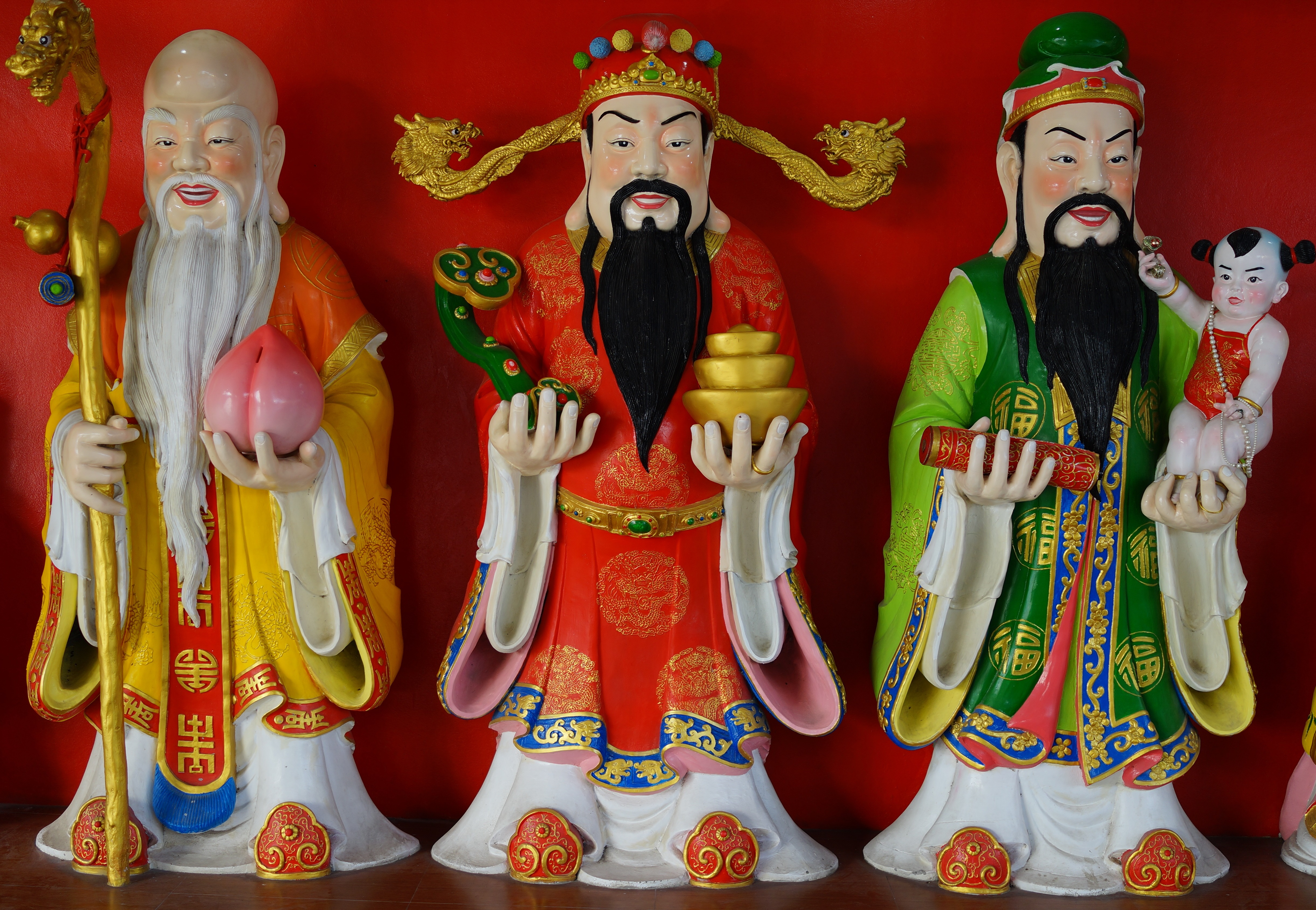
The Sanxing (Three Stars Gods) at a Chinese temple in Mongkok, Hong Kong

Heaven worship is a Chinese religious belief that predates Taoism and Confucianism, but was later incorporated into both. Shangdi is the supreme unknowable god of Chinese folk religion. Over time, namely following the conquests of the Zhou dynasty who worshipped Tian (天 lit. "sky"), Shangdi became synonymous with Tian, or Heaven. During the Zhou dynasty, Tian not only became synonymous with the physical sky but also embodied the divine will, representing the moral order of the universe. This evolution marked a shift from the earlier concept of Shangdi to a more abstract and universal principle that guided both natural and human affairs. In the Han dynasty the worship of Heaven would be highly ritualistic and require that the emperor hold official sacrifices and worship at an altar of Heaven, the most famous of which is the Temple of Heaven in Beijing.

Heaven worship is closely linked with ancestor veneration and polytheism, as the ancestors and the gods are seen as a medium between Heaven and man. The Emperor of China, also known as the "Son of Heaven", derived the Mandate of Heaven, and thus his legitimacy as ruler, from his supposed ability to commune with Heaven on behalf of his nation. This mandate was reinforced through celestial observations and rituals, as astrological phenomena were interpreted as omens reflecting the favor or disfavor of Heaven. The Emperor's role was to perform the necessary rites to maintain harmony between Heaven and Earth, ensuring the prosperity of his reign.

Star worship was widespread in Asia, especially in Mongolia and northern China, and also spread to Korea. According to Edward Schafer, star worship was already established during the Han dynasty (202 BCE – 220 CE), with the Nine Imperial Gods becoming star lords. The Big Dipper (Beidou) and the North Star (Polaris) were particularly significant in Chinese star worship. The Big Dipper was associated with cosmic order and governance, while the North Star was considered the throne of the celestial emperor. These stars played a crucial role in state rituals, where the Emperor's ability to align these celestial forces with earthly governance was seen as essential to his legitimacy. This star worship, along with indigenous shamanism and medical practice, formed one of the original bases of Taoism. The Heavenly Sovereign was identified with the Big Dipper and the North Star. Worship of Heaven in the southern suburb of the capital was initiated in 31 BCE and firmly established in the first century CE (Western Han).

The Sanxing (Chinese: 三星; lit. 'Three Stars') are the gods of the three stars or constellations considered essential in Chinese astrology and mythology: Jupiter, Ursa Major, and Sirius. Fu, Lu, and Shou (traditional Chinese: 福祿壽; simplified Chinese: 福禄寿; pinyin: Fú Lù Shòu; Cantonese Yale: Fūk Luhk Sauh), or Cai, Zi and Shou (財子壽) are also the embodiments of Fortune (Fu), presiding over planet Jupiter, Prosperity (Lu), presiding over Ursa Major, and Longevity (Shou), presiding over Sirius.

During the Tang dynasty, Chinese Buddhism adopted Taoist Big Dipper worship, borrowing various texts and rituals which were then modified to conform with Buddhist practices and doctrines. The integration of Big Dipper worship into Buddhist practices highlights the adaptability of star worship in China, where it was syncretized with various religious traditions over time. The cult of the Big Dipper was eventually absorbed into the cults of various Buddhist divinities, Myōken being one of these.

=== Japan ===
Star worship was also practiced in Japan. Japanese star worship is largely based on Chinese cosmology. According to Bernard Faure, "the cosmotheistic nature of esoteric Buddhism provided an easy bridge for cultural translation between Indian and Chinese cosmologies, on the one hand, and between Indian astrology and local Japanese folk beliefs about the stars, on the other".

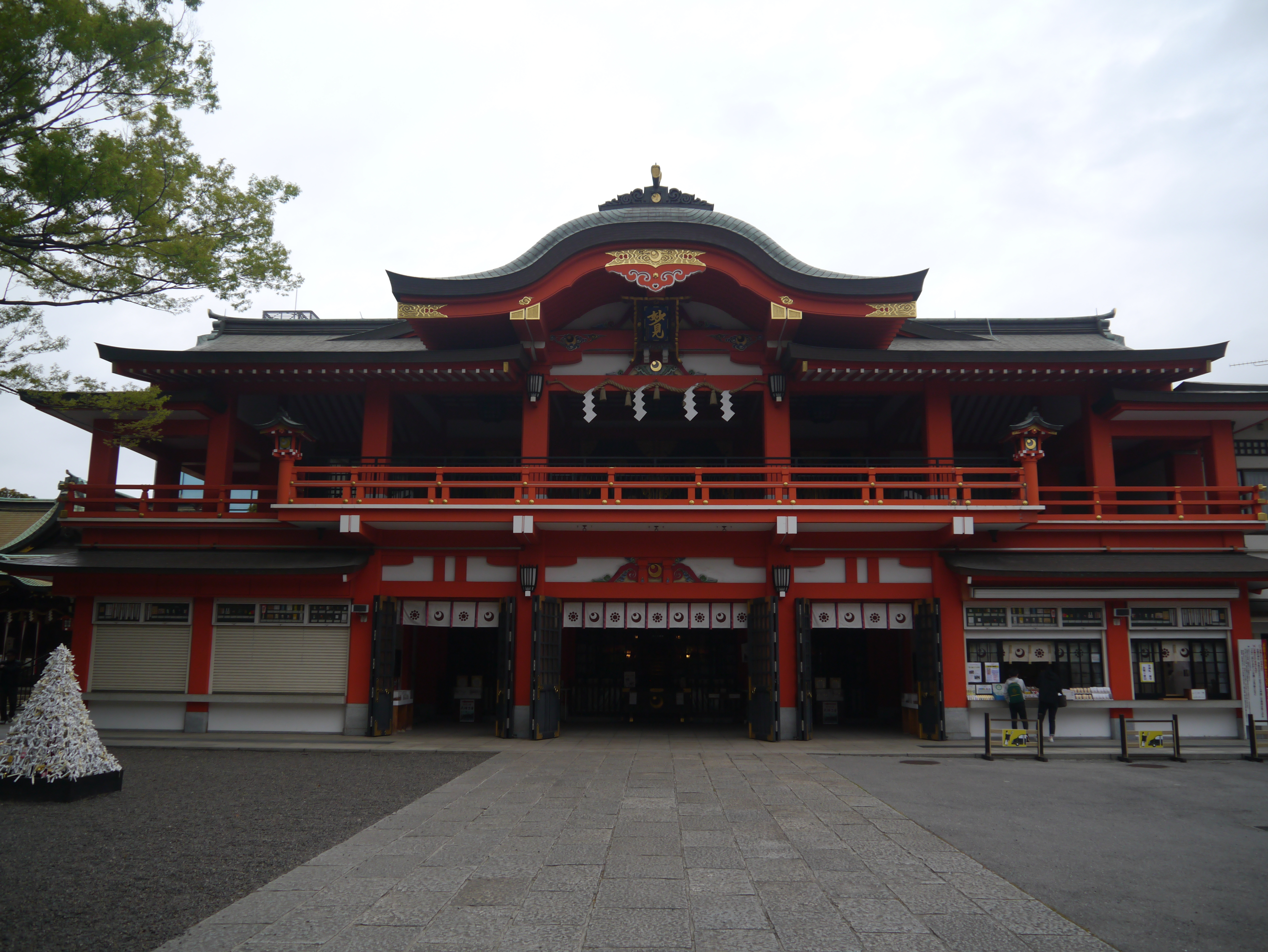
Chiba Shrine in Chiba City, Chiba Prefecture. Originally an 11th-century Buddhist temple dedicated to Myōken, converted into a Shinto shrine during the Meiji period.

The cult of Myōken is thought to have been brought into Japan during the 7th century by immigrants (toraijin) from Goguryeo and Baekje. During the reign of Emperor Tenji (661–672), the toraijin were resettled in the easternmost parts of the country; as a result, Myōken worship spread throughout the eastern provinces.

By the Heian period, pole star worship had become widespread enough that imperial decrees banned it for the reason that it involved "mingling of men and women", and thus caused ritual impurity. Pole star worship was also forbidden among the inhabitants of the capital and nearby areas when the imperial princess (Saiō) made her way to Ise to begin her service at the shrines. Nevertheless, the cult of the pole star left its mark on imperial rituals such as the emperor's enthronement and the worship of the imperial clan deity at Ise Shrine. Worship of the pole star was also practiced in Onmyōdō, where it was deified as Chintaku Reifujin (鎮宅霊符神).

Myōken worship was particularly prevalent among clans based in eastern Japan (the modern Kantō and Tōhoku regions), with the Kanmu Taira clan (Kanmu Heishi) and their offshoots such as the Chiba and the Sōma clans being among the deity's notable devotees. One legend claims that Taira no Masakado was a devotee of Myōken, who aided him in his military exploits. When Masakado grew proud and arrogant, the deity withdrew his favor and instead aided Masakado's uncle Yoshifumi, the ancestor of the Chiba clan. Owing to his status as the Chiba clan's ujigami (guardian deity), temples and shrines dedicated to Myōken are particularly numerous in former Chiba territories. Myōken worship is also prevalent in many Nichiren-shū Buddhist temples due to the clan's connections with the school's Nakayama lineage.

=== Indigenous America ===
Celestial objects hold a significant place within Indigenous American cultures. From the Lakota in North America to the Inca in South America, the celestial realm was integrated into daily life. Stars served as navigation aids, temporal markers, and spiritual conduits, illustrating their practical and sacred importance.

Heavenly bodies held spiritual wisdom. The Pleiades, revered in various cultures, symbolized diverse concepts such as agricultural cycles and ancestral spirits. In North America, star worship was practiced by the Lakota people and the Wichita people. The Inca civilization engaged in star worship, and associated constellations with deities and forces, while the Milky Way represented a bridge between earthly and divine realms.

Indigenous American cultures encapsulate a holistic worldview that acknowledges the interplay of humanity, nature, and the cosmos. Oral traditions transmitted cosmic stories, infusing mythologies, songs, and ceremonies with cosmic significance. These narratives emphasized the belief that the celestial realm offered insights into origins and purpose.

=== Gnosticism ===
Gnosticism largely relies on Greek and Persian dualism, especially on Platonism. In accordance with Platonism, they regarded the idea as good while considering the material and conscious world to be inherently evil. The demonized star-deities of late Persian religion became associated with a demon, thus identifying the seven observable planets with an Archon (demonic ruler). These demons rule over the earth and the realm of planets, representing different desires and passions. According to Origen, the Ophites depicted the world as surrounded by the demonic Leviathan.

The term daimons was used for demons and refers to both the Archons as well as to their demonic assistants. Judas Iscariot is, in the Gospel of Judas, portrayed as the thirteenth daimon for betraying Jesus and a supporter of the Archons.

Examples of Gnostic portrayals of demons can be found in the Apocryphon of John in which they are said to have helped to construct the physical Adam and in Pistis Sophia which states they are ruled over by Hekate and punish corrupt souls.

In Mandaeism, the seven planets (Classical Mandaic: ࡔࡅࡁࡀ šuba, "The Seven"; Classical Mandaic: ࡔࡉࡁࡉࡀࡄࡉࡀ šibiahia, "planets"; or, combined, šuba šibiahia "Seven Planets") and twelve constellations of the zodiac (frequently known as the trisar (Classical Mandaic: ࡕࡓࡉࡎࡀࡓ, "The Twelve") or trisar malwašia ("Twelve Constellations") in Mandaic texts) are considered to be demons that are not viewed favorably, since they constitute part of the entourage of Ruha, the Queen of the World of Darkness, who is also their mother.

== Institutionalized religions ==
=== Judaism ===
The Hebrew Bible contains repeated reference denouncing astrolatry. Deuteronomy 4:19, 17:3 contains a stern warning against worshipping the Sun, Moon, stars or any of the heavenly host. Relapse into worshipping the host of heaven (i.e. the stars) is said to have been the cause of the fall of the Kingdom of Judah in II Kings 17:16. King Josiah in 621 BCE is recorded as having abolished all kinds of idolatry in Judah, but astrolatry continued in private (Zephaniah 1:5; Jeremiah 8:2, 19:13). Ezekiel 8:16 describes sun-worship practised in the court of the Temple of Jerusalem, and Jeremiah 44:17 says that even after the destruction of the Temple, women in particular insisted on continuing their worship of the "Queen of Heaven".

=== Christianity ===
Augustine of Hippo criticized sun- and star-worship in De Vera Religione (37.68) and De civitate Dei (5.1–8). Pope Leo the Great also denounced astrolatry and the cult of Sol Invictus, which he contrasted with the Christian Nativity of Jesus.

=== Manichaeism ===
In Manichaeism, views on stars (abāxtarān) are mixed. On one hand, they are regarded as light particles of the world soul fixed in the sky. On the other hand, stars are identified with powers hindering the soul from leaving the material world. The Third Messenger (Jesus) is said to have chained up demons in the sky. Their offspring, the nephilim (nĕf īlīm) or asrestar (āsarēštārān), Ašqalūn and Nebrō'ēl in particular, play instrumental roles in the creation of Adam and Eve.

=== Islam ===
Astrolatry is mentioned in the Quran, in the context of the prophet Ibrahim (Abraham)'s observation of celestial bodies in Surat al-An'am. Scholarly analysis of Islamic beliefs underscores the unequivocal monotheism emphasized in the Quran and Hadith literature. The Qur'an repeatedly emphasizes the singular nature of God and denounces the attribution of divinity to any other entities, celestial or terrestrial. This monotheistic stance is deeply ingrained within Islamic theology and is extensively discussed in academic works on Islamic belief systems.

Muhammad's teachings, as documented in Hadith literature, reflect his commitment to monotheism and opposition to idolatry. Academic studies in Islamic theology and comparative religion affirm the contrast between Islamic monotheism and the practice of astrolatry. Islamic scholars and researchers underline that the focus of Islamic spirituality remains centered on the worship of God alone, with no association of divinity to any created entities, including celestial bodies.

== See also ==
- Archeoastronomy
- Astraea
- Astraeus
- Astronomy and religion
- Astrological age
- Astrotheology
- Babylonian astrology
- Behenian fixed star
- Body of light
- Ceremonial magic
- Decan
- Eosphorus
- Hellenistic astrology
- History of astrology
- History of astronomy
- Lunar station
- Magic and religion
- Natural theology
- Nature worship
- Pantheon
- Planets in astrology
- Pleiades in folklore and literature
- Religious cosmology
- Renaissance magic
- Royal stars
- Seven heavens
- Sidereal compass rose
- Stars in astrology
- Sky father
- Star people
- Stellar deities
- Venusian deities
