= Sopdet =

Ancient Egyptian deity

- Sopdet in green dress, with star on her head
Name in hieroglyphs
M44 N14 X1 H8 (Note: Variant spellings of Sopdet include M44 Q3 D46 X1 N14 B1, M44 X1 B1, M44 X1 N14, N14 X1 H8 I12, S29 Q3 D46 M44 Y1V, S29 X1 M44 N14, and in late Egyptian: N14 G7, M44 N14 B7 (really B7E), and M44 N14 X1 H8 B7 (really B7E).)
- Symbol: Sirius; dog (Ptolemaic/Roman)
- Consort: Sah (Orion); Osiris
- Offspring: Sopdu (Venus); Horus

Sopdet is the Ancient Egyptian name of the star Sirius and its personification as an Egyptian goddess. Known to the Greeks as Sothis, she was conflated with Isis as a goddess and Anubis as a god.

== Names ==
The exact pronunciation of ancient Egyptian is uncertain, as vowels were not recorded until a very late period. In modern transcription, her name usually appears as Sopdet (Spdt, lit. 'Triangle' or 'Sharp One'), after the known Greek and Latin form Sothis (Σῶθις, Sō̂this).

== History ==
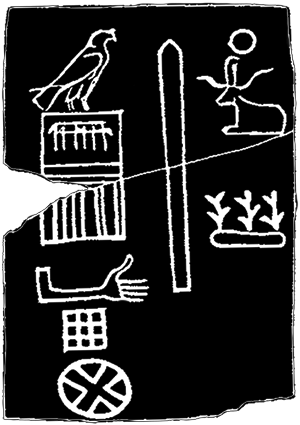
The tablet's engravings were believed to discuss the bull-formed Sopdet.

During the early period of Egyptian civilization, the heliacal rising of the bright star preceded the usual annual flooding of the Nile. It was therefore apparently used for the solar civil calendar which largely superseded the original lunar calendar in the 3rd millennium BC. Despite the wandering nature of the Egyptian calendar, the erratic timing of the flood from year to year, and the slow procession of Sirius within the solar year, Sopdet continued to remain central to cultural depictions of the year and to celebrations of Wep Renpet (Wp Rnpt), the Egyptian New Year. She was also venerated as a goddess of the fertility brought to the soil by the flooding.

She was long thought to be represented by the cow on an ivory tablet from the reign of Djer (Dynasty I), but this is no longer supported by most Egyptologists. During the Old Kingdom, she was an important goddess of the annual flood and a psychopomp guiding deceased pharaohs through the Egyptian underworld. During the Middle Kingdom, she was primarily a mother and nurse and, by the Ptolemaic period, she was almost entirely subsumed into Isis.

== Myths ==
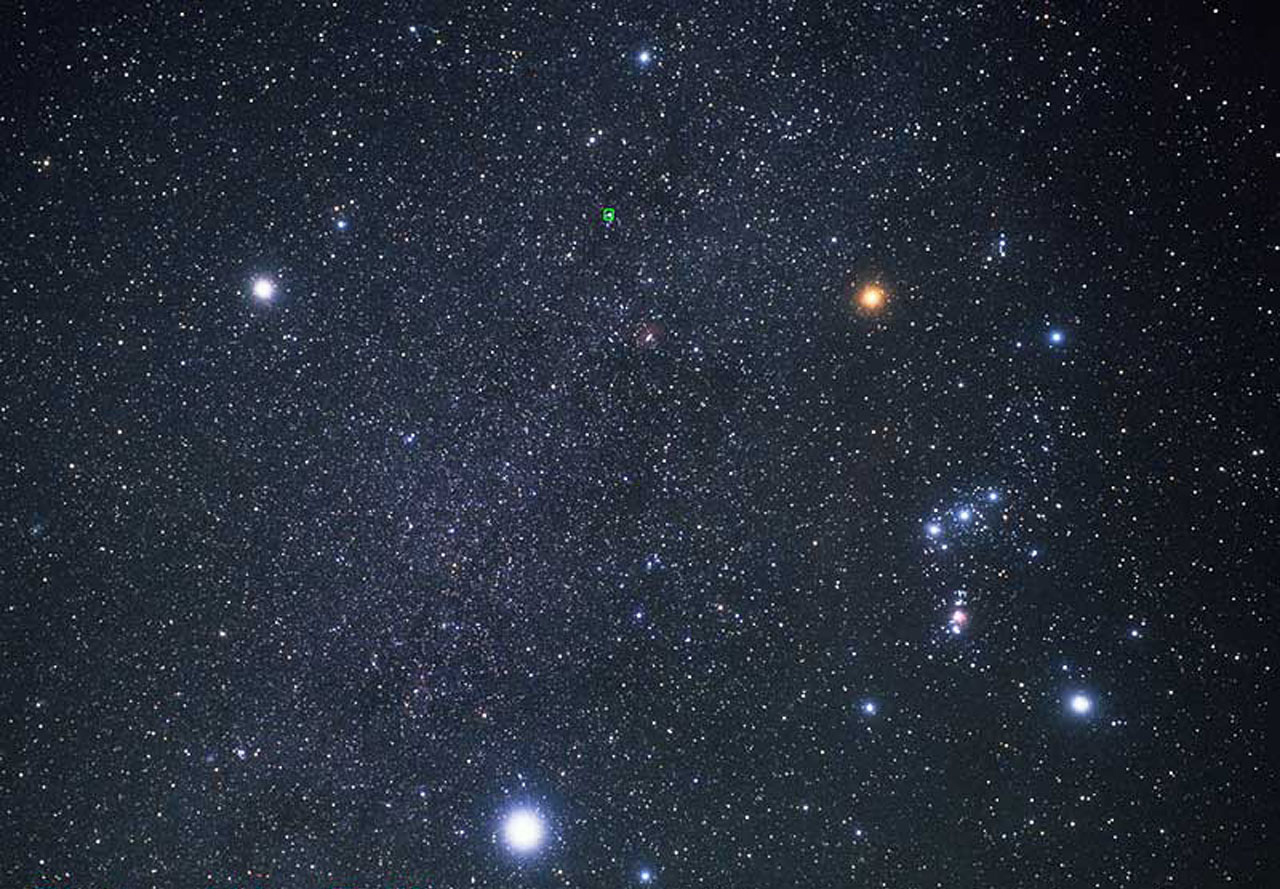
Sirius (bottom) and Orion (right). Together, the three brightest stars of the northern winter sky—Sirius, Betelgeuse (top right), and Procyon (top left)—can also be understood as forming the Winter Triangle.

Sopdet is the consort of Sah, the personified constellation of Orion near Sirius. Their child Venus was the hawk god Sopdu, "Lord of the East". As the "bringer of the New Year and the Nile flood", she was associated with Osiris from an early date and by the Ptolemaic period Sah and Sopdet almost solely appeared in forms conflated with Osiris and Isis.

== Representation ==
She was depicted as a woman with a five-pointed star upon her head, usually with a horned hedjet similar to Satis. In the Ptolemaic and Roman period, the European notion of the "Dog Star" caused her to sometimes be represented as a large dog or as a woman riding one sidesaddle.

From the Middle Kingdom, Sopdet sometimes appeared as a god who held up part of Nut (the sky or firmament) with Hathor. In Greco-Roman Egypt, the male Sopdet was conflated with the dog-headed Anubis.

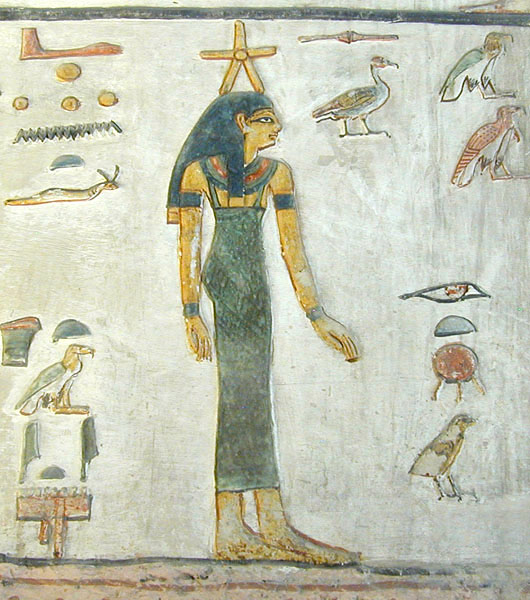
A stellar goddess, possibly Sopdet, from the c. 1300 BC tomb of Seti I.

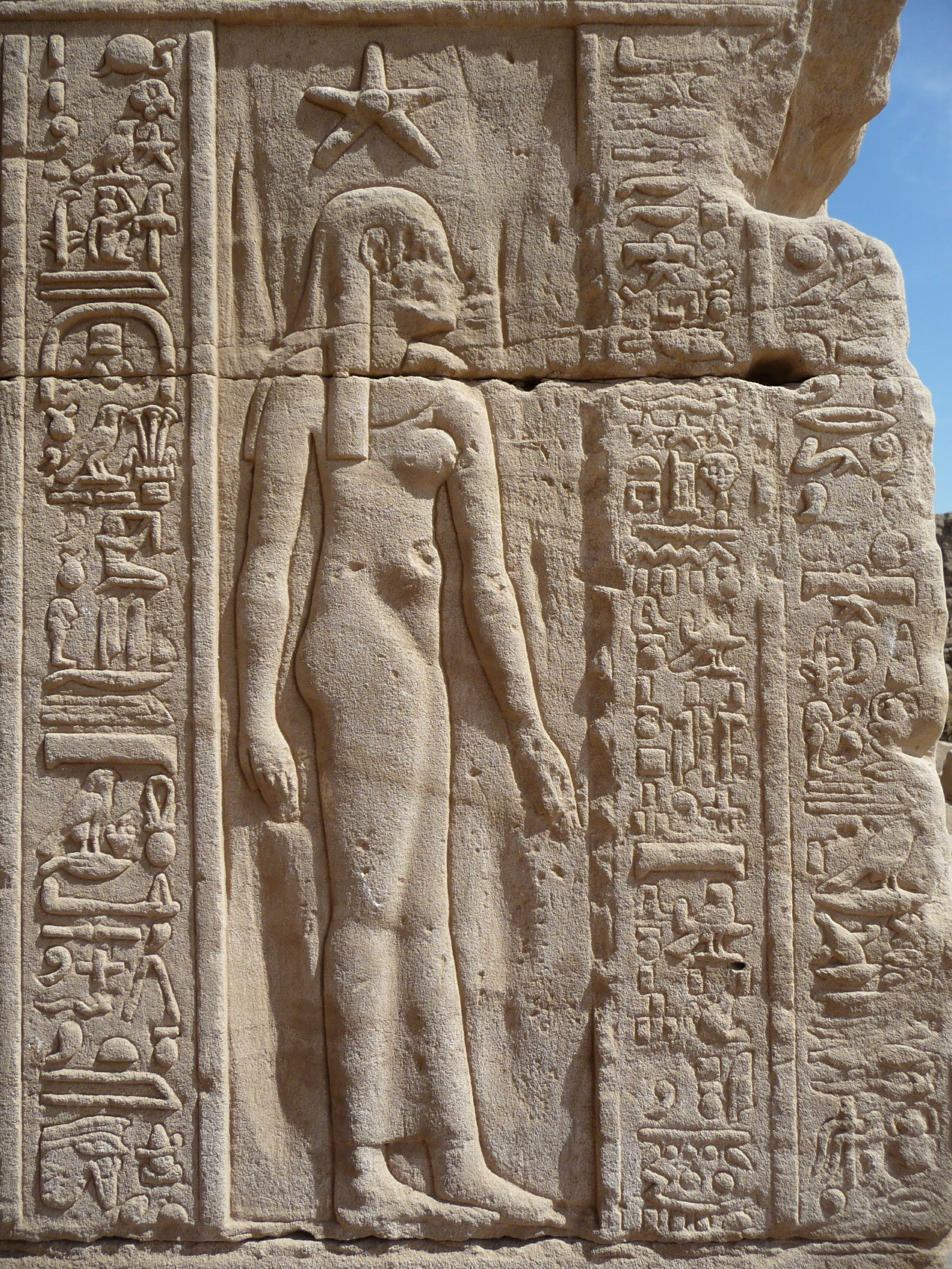
Sopdet depicted in the Dendera Temple complex.

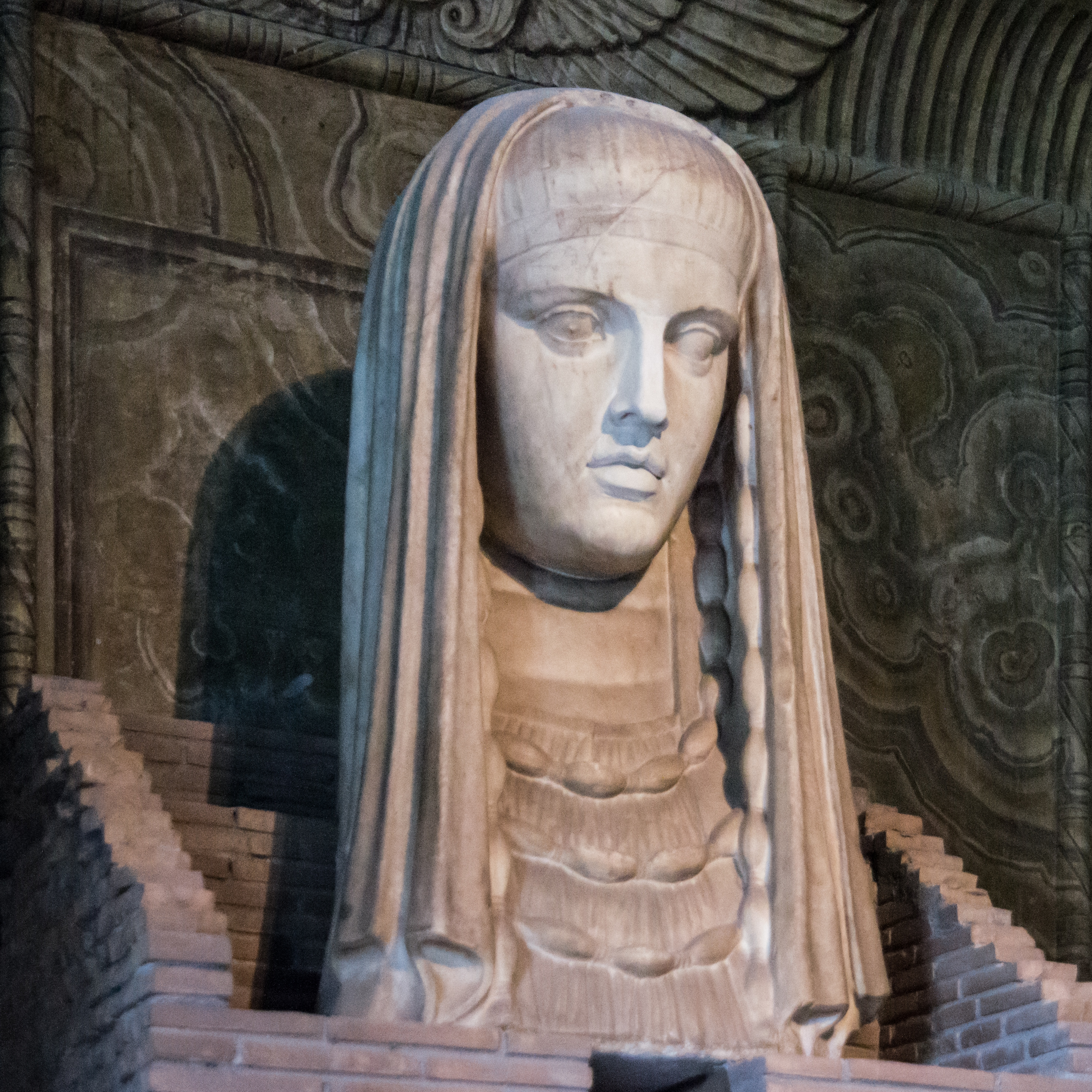
A Hellenic bust of Sopdet, syncretized with Isis and Demeter.

== See also ==
- Ikhemu-sek
- Astrotheology
- Book of Sothis
- Sothic cycle
