= Khensit =

Egyptian deity

- Parents: Ra
- Consort: Sopdu

In Egyptian mythology, Khensit (also spelled Chensit, Khenset), which means "placenta", was the patron goddess of the twentieth nome of Lower Egypt. Khensit was the wife of Sopdu and the daughter of Ra, and was depicted as an uraeus. Khensit and Sopdu were sometimes known as the divine pair of Saft el-Hinna.

Khensit was portrayed in many ways, including as Hathor-Isis.
