= Sothic cycle =

1460 year calendar cycle of ancient Egypt

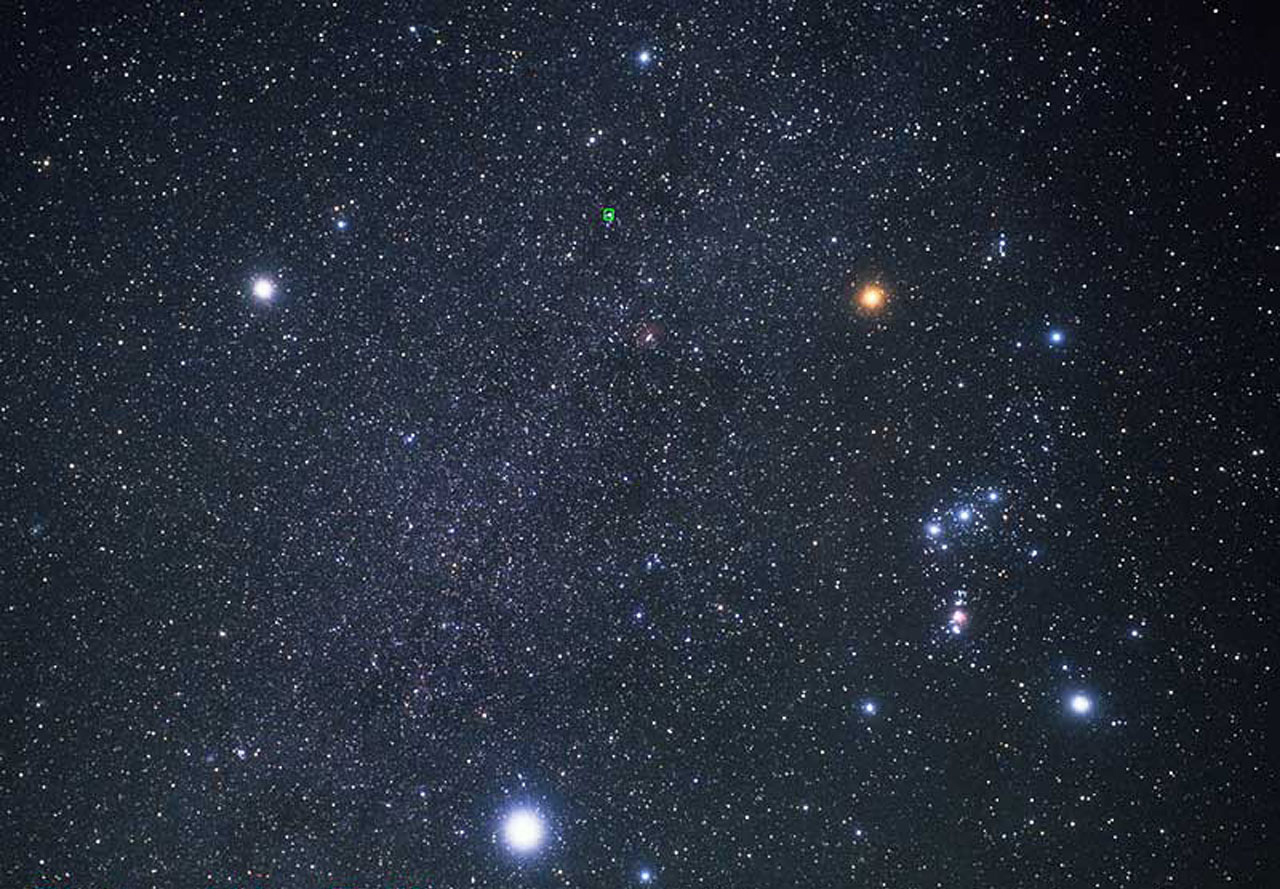
Sirius (bottom) and Orion (right). The Winter Triangle is formed from the three brightest stars in the northern winter sky: Sirius, Betelgeuse (top right), and Procyon (top left).

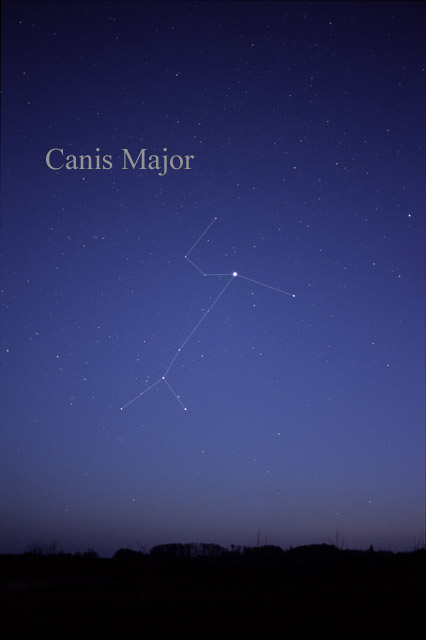
Sirius as the brightest star in the constellation Canis Major as observed from the Earth (lines added for clarity).

The Sothic cycle or Canicular period (Ancient Egyptian: spdt or Sopdet, 'Triangle'; Ancient Greek: Σῶθις, Sō̂this) is a period of 1,461 Egyptian civil years of 365 days each or 1,460 Julian years averaging 365 1/4 days each. During a Sothic cycle, the 365-day year loses enough time that the start of its year once again coincides with the heliacal rising of the star Sirius on 19 July in the Julian calendar. (Note: The date slowly varies within the Gregorian calendar, moving about three days later every four centuries. It presently occurs around the beginning of August.) It is an important aspect of Egyptology, particularly with regard to reconstructions of the Egyptian calendar and its history. Astronomical records of this displacement may have been responsible for the later establishment of the more accurate Julian and Alexandrian calendars.

== Mechanics ==
The ancient Egyptian civil year, its holidays, and religious records reflect its apparent establishment at a point when the return of the bright star Sirius to the night sky was considered to herald the annual flooding of the Nile. However, because the civil calendar was exactly 365 days long and did not incorporate leap years until 22 BCE, its months "wandered" backwards through the solar year at the rate of about one day in every four years. This almost exactly corresponded to its displacement against the Sothic year as well. (The Sothic year is about a minute longer than a Julian year.) The sidereal year of 365.25636 days is valid only for stars on the ecliptic (the apparent path of the Sun across the sky) and having no proper motion, whereas Sirius's displacement ~40° below the ecliptic, its proper motion, and the wobbling of the celestial equator cause the period between its heliacal risings to be almost exactly 365.25 days long instead. This steady loss of one relative day every four years over the course of the 365-day calendar meant that the "wandering" day would return to its original place relative to the solar and Sothic year after precisely 1461 Egyptian civil years or 1460 Julian years.

== Discovery ==
This calendar cycle was well known in antiquity. Censorinus described it in his book De Die Natale, in CE 238, and stated that the cycle had renewed 100 years earlier on the 12th of August. In the ninth century, Syncellus epitomized the Sothic Cycle in the "Old Egyptian Chronicle." Isaac Cullimore, an early Egyptologist and member of the Royal Society, published a discourse on it in 1833 in which he was the first to suggest that Censorinus had fudged the terminus date, and that it was more likely to fall in CE 136. He also computed the likely date of its invention as being around 1600 BCE.

In 1904, seven decades after Cullimore, Eduard Meyer carefully combed known Egyptian inscriptions and written materials to find any mention of the calendar dates when Sirius rose at dawn. He found six of them, on which the dates of much of conventional Egyptian chronology are based. A heliacal rise of Sirius was recorded by Censorinus as having happened on the Egyptian New Year's Day between 139 CE and 142 CE.

The record itself actually refers to 21 July 140 CE, but astronomical calculation definitely dates the heliacal rising at 20 July 139 CE, Julian. This correlates the Egyptian calendar to the Julian calendar. A Julian leap day occurs in 140 CE, and so the new year on 1 Thoth is 20 July in 139 CE but it is 19 July for 140–142 CE. Thus Meyer was able to compare the Egyptian civil calendar date on which Sirius was observed rising heliacally to the Julian calendar date on which Sirius ought to have risen, count the number of intercalary days needed, and determine how many years were between the beginning of a cycle and the observation.

To calculate a date astronomically, one also needs to know the place of observation, since the latitude of the observation changes the day when the heliacal rising of Sirius can be seen, and mislocating an observation can potentially throw off the resulting chronology by several decades. Official observations are known to have been made at Heliopolis (or Memphis, near Cairo), Thebes, and Elephantine (near Aswan), with the rising of Sirius observed at Cairo about 8 days after it is seen at Aswan.

Meyer concluded that the Egyptian civil calendar was created in 4241 BCE. Recent scholarship, however, has discredited that claim. Most scholars either move the observation upon which he based this forward by one cycle of Sirius, to 19 July 2781 BCE, or reject the assumption that the document on which Meyer relied indicates a rise of Sirius at all.

== Chronological interpretation ==
Three specific observations of the heliacal rise of Sirius are extremely important for Egyptian chronology. The first is the aforementioned ivory tablet from the reign of Djer which supposedly indicates the beginning of a Sothic cycle, the rising of Sirius on the same day as the new year. If this does indicate the beginning of a Sothic cycle, it must date to about 17 July 2773 BCE. However, this date is too late for Djer's reign, so many scholars believe that it indicates a correlation between the rising of Sirius and the Egyptian lunar calendar, instead of the solar Egyptian civil calendar, which would render the tablet essentially devoid of chronological value.

Gautschy et al. (2017) claimed that a newly discovered Sothis date from the Old Kingdom and a subsequent astronomic study confirms the Sothic cycle model.

The second observation is clearly a reference to a heliacal rising, and is believed to date to the seventh year of Senusret III. This observation was almost certainly made at Itj-Tawy, the Twelfth Dynasty capital, which would date the Twelfth Dynasty from 1963 to 1786 BCE. The Ramses or Turin Papyrus Canon says 213 years (1991–1778 BCE), Parker reduces it to 206 years (1991–1785 BCE), based on 17 July 1872 BCE as the Sothic date (120th year of 12th dynasty, a drift of 30 leap days). Prior to Parker's investigation of lunar dates, the 12th dynasty was placed as 213 years of 2007–1794 BCE interpreting the date 21 July 1888 BCE as the 120th year, and then for 2003–1790 BCE interpreting the date 20 July 1884 BCE as the 120th year.

The third observation was in the reign of Amenhotep I, and, assuming it was made in Thebes, dates his reign between 1525 and 1504 BCE. If made in Memphis, Heliopolis, or some other Delta site instead, as a minority of scholars still argue, the entire chronology of the 18th Dynasty needs to be extended some 20 years.

== Observational procedure and precession ==
The Sothic cycle is a specific example of two cycles of differing length interacting to cycle together, here called a tertiary cycle. This is mathematically defined by the formula $\frac{1}{a} + \frac{1}{b} = \frac{1}{t}$ or half the harmonic mean. In the case of the Sothic cycle the two cycles are the Egyptian civil year and the Sothic year.

The Sothic year is the length of time for the star Sirius to visually return to the same position in relation to the sun. Star years measured in this way vary due to axial precession, the movement of the Earth's axis in relation to the sun.

The length of time for a star to make a yearly path can be marked when it rises to a defined altitude above a local horizon at the time of sunrise. This altitude does not have to be the altitude of first possible visibility, nor the exact position observed. Throughout the year the star will rise to whatever altitude was chosen near the horizon approximately four minutes earlier each successive sunrise. Eventually the star will return to the same relative location at sunrise, regardless of the altitude chosen. This length of time can be called an observational year. Stars that reside close to the ecliptic or the ecliptic meridian will – on average – exhibit observational years close to the sidereal year of 365.2564 days. The ecliptic and the meridian cut the sky into four quadrants. The axis of the earth wobbles around slowly moving the observer and changing the observation of the event. If the axis swings the observer closer to the event its observational year will be shortened. Likewise, the observational year can be lengthened when the axis swings away from the observer. This depends upon which quadrant of the sky the phenomenon is observed.

The Sothic year is remarkable because its average duration happened to have been nearly exactly 365.25 days, in the early 4th millennium BCE before the unification of Egypt. The slow rate of change from this value is also of note. If observations and records could have been maintained during predynastic times the Sothic rise would optimally return to the same calendar day after 1461 calendar years. This value would drop to about 1456 calendar years by the Middle Kingdom. The value 1461 could also be maintained if the date of the Sothic rise were artificially maintained by moving the feast in celebration of this event one day every fourth year instead of rarely adjusting it according to observation.

== Problems and criticisms ==
Determining the date of a heliacal rise of Sirius has been shown to be difficult, especially considering the need to know the exact latitude of the observation. Another problem is that because the Egyptian calendar loses one day every four years, a heliacal rise will take place on the same day for four years in a row, and any observation of that rise can date to any of those four years, making the observation imprecise.

A number of criticisms have been levelled against the reliability of dating by the Sothic cycle. Some are serious enough to be considered problematic. Firstly, none of the astronomical observations have dates that mention the specific pharaoh in whose reign they were observed, forcing Egyptologists to supply that information on the basis of a certain amount of informed speculation. Secondly, there is no information regarding the nature of the civil calendar throughout the course of Egyptian history, forcing Egyptologists to assume that it existed unchanged for thousands of years; the Egyptians would only have needed to carry out one calendar reform in a few thousand years for these calculations to be worthless. Other criticisms are not considered as problematic, e.g. there is no extant mention of the Sothic cycle in ancient Egyptian writing, which may simply be a result of it either being so obvious to Egyptians that it didn't merit mention, or to relevant texts being destroyed over time or still awaiting discovery.

Marc Van de Mieroop, in his discussion of chronology and dating, does not mention the Sothic cycle at all, and asserts that the bulk of historians nowadays would consider that it is not possible to put forward exact dates earlier than the 8th century BCE.

Some have recently claimed that the Theran eruption marks the beginning of the Eighteenth Dynasty, due to Theran ash and pumice discovered in the ruins of Avaris, in layers that mark the end of the Hyksos era. Because the evidence of dendrochronologists indicates the eruption took place in 1626 BCE, this has been taken to indicate that dating by the Sothic cycle is off by 50–80 years at the outset of the 18th Dynasty. Claims that the Thera eruption is described on the Tempest Stele of Ahmose I have been disputed by writers such as Peter James.

== See also ==
- Chronology of the ancient Near East
