= Ikhemu-sek =

Group of ancient Egyptian deities

- The Ikhemu-sek, based from image the tomb of Pharaoh Seti I (KV17) Nineteenth Dynasty, astronomical vaulted ceiling Valley of the Kings
Name in hieroglyphs
i x m s sk k sbA
- Symbol: Stars, constellations

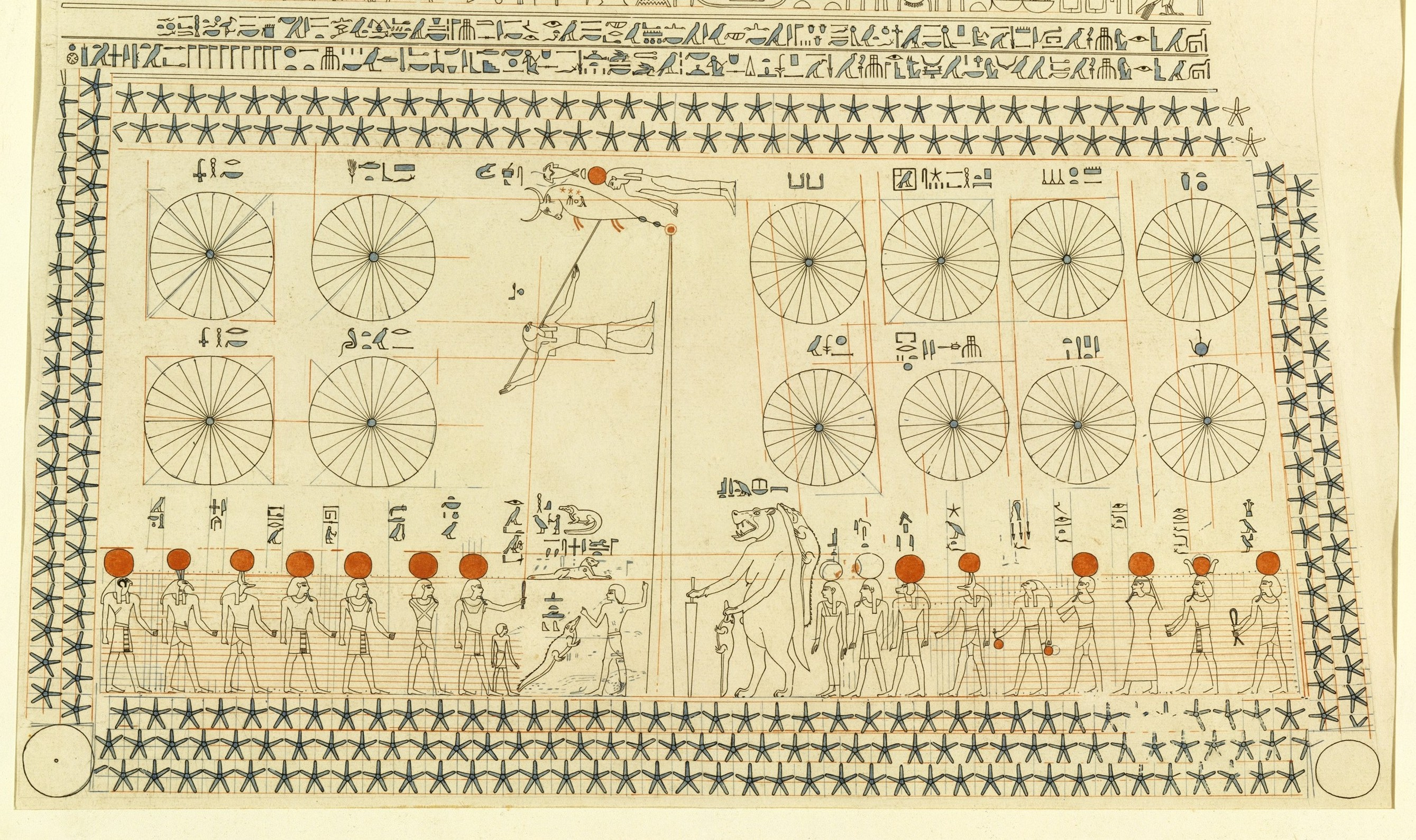
The Ikhemu-sek (middle) depicted on the astronomical ceiling in the tomb of Senenmut (TT71)

The Ikhemu-sek (Ancient Egyptian: j.ḫmw-sk – literally "the ones not knowing destruction" also known as the Imperishable ones) were a group of ancient Egyptian minor deities who were the personifications of the northern constellations.

== History ==
The northern constellations were depicted in the tomb of Senenmut on the astronomical ceiling. The Ikhemu-sek were also found on the astronomical vaulted ceilings of tombs in the Valley of the Kings.

== Iconography ==
The Ikhemu-sek where portrayed as both animal and human-like: A woman, lion (leo), bull, man, falcon-headed man, man, and hippopotamus.

== See also ==
- Sopdet
- Sah
- Astrotheology
- The Indestructibles
- Nut
- Mehet-Weret
