= Behenian fixed star =

Application in medieval astrology

The Behenian fixed stars are a selection of fifteen stars considered especially useful for magical applications in the medieval astrology of Europe and the Arab world. Their name derives from the Arabic bahman, "root," as each was considered a source of astrological power for one or more planets. Each is also connected with a gemstone and plant that would be used in rituals meant to draw the star's influence (e.g., into a talisman). When a planet was within six degrees of an associated star, this influence was thought to be particularly strong.

== History ==
Heinrich Cornelius Agrippa discussed them in his Three Books of Occult Philosophy (Book II, chapters 47 & 52) as the Behenii (singular Behenius), describing their magical workings and sigils. He attributed these to Hermes Trismegistus, as was common with occult traditions in the Middle Ages. Their true origin remains unknown, though Sir Wallis Budge suspects a possible Sumerian source.

== Table of Behenian stars ==
The following table uses symbols from a 1531 quarto edition of Agrippa, but other forms exist. Where the name used in old texts differs from the one in use today, the modern form is given first.

Name		Astronomical designation	Longitude (2020) (Note: These locations are given in celestial longitude, the relatively fixed reference frame of tropical signs used in astrology. Due to the precession of the equinoxes the fixed stars appear to precess through space at the rate of ~1 degree of arc per 72 years. In order to fix the measurement to a specific date and degree of arc the values published are utilized for the year 2020. All celestial bodies, including stars and constellations, are measured according to various fixed frameworks, in this instance a geocentric tropical zodiac. Cf. Heliocentric model as a fixed framework and sidereal and tropical astrology to identify the measuring system used here. For example, "26 Taurus 10" means 26 degrees 10 minutes of the tropical sign Taurus. See ecliptic coordinate system for further information.)	Planet	Gemstone	Plant	Symbol
Algol	Caput Larvæ	Beta Persei	26 Taurus 26	Saturn & Jupiter	diamond	black hellebore	
Alcyone	(or Pleiades)	Eta Tauri	00 Gemini 16	Moon & Mars	rock crystal	fennel	
Aldebaran	Aldaboram	Alpha Tauri	10 Gemini 04	Mars & Venus	ruby / garnet	milk thistle	
Capella	Alhayhoch, Hircus	Alpha Aurigæ	22 Gemini 08	Jupiter & Saturn	sapphire	thyme	
Sirius	Canis major	Alpha Canis Majoris	14 Cancer 21	Venus	beryl	juniper	
Procyon	Canis minor	Alpha Canis Minoris	26 Cancer 03	Mercury & Mars	agate	water buttercup	
Regulus	Cor leonis	Alpha Leonis	00 Virgo 06	Jupiter & Mars	garnet	mugwort	
Alkaid	Tail of the Great Bear	Eta Ursae Majoris	27 Virgo 12	Venus & Moon	magnet	succory	
Algorab	Corvi	Delta Corvi	13 Libra 43	Saturn & Mars	onyx	burdock	
Spica		Alpha Virginis	24 Libra 06	Venus & Mercury	emerald	sage	
Arcturus	Alchameth	Alpha Boötis	24 Libra 30	Mars & Jupiter	jasper	plantain	
Alphecca	Elpheia	Alpha Coronæ Borealis	12 Scorpio 34	Venus & Mars	topaz	rosemary	
Antares	Cor scorpii	Alpha Scorpii	10 Sagittarius 01	Mars & Jupiter	sardonyx	birthwort	
Vega	Vultur cadens	Alpha Lyræ	15 Capricorn 34	Mercury & Venus	chrysolite	winter savory	
Deneb Algedi	Cauda capricorni	Delta Capricorni	23 Aquarius 48	Saturn & Mercury	chalcedony	marjoram	

== See also ==
- Olympian spirits
- Worship of heavenly bodies
