= Heliacal rising =

Rising of stars prior to sunrise

The heliacal rising (/hɪˈlaɪ.əkəl/ hih-LY-ə-kəl) of a star or a planet occurs annually, when it becomes visible above the eastern horizon at dawn in the brief moment just before sunrise (thus becoming "the morning star"). (Note: Heliacal risings occur after a star has been behind the Sun for a season, and it is just returning to visibility. There is one morning, just before dawn, when the star suddenly reappears after its absence. On that day it "blinks" on for a moment just before the sunrise and just before it is then obliterated by the [overwhelming light of the] Sun's presence. That one special morning is called the star's heliacal rising.) A heliacal rising marks the time when a star or planet becomes visible for the first time again in the night sky after having set with the Sun at the western horizon in a previous sunset (its heliacal setting), having since been in the sky only during daytime, obscured by sunlight.

Historically, the most important such rising is that of Sirius, which was an important feature of the Egyptian calendar and astronomical development. The rising of the Pleiades heralded the start of the Ancient Greek sailing season, using celestial navigation, as well as the farming season (attested by Hesiod in his Works and Days). Heliacal rising is only one of several types of alignment for stars' risings and settings; mostly the risings and settings of celestial objects are organized into lists of morning and evening risings and settings. Culmination in the evening and the culmination in the morning are separated by half a year, while on the other hand risings and settings in the evenings and the mornings are only separated by a half-year at the equator, and at other latitudes set apart by different fractions of the year.

== Cause and significance ==
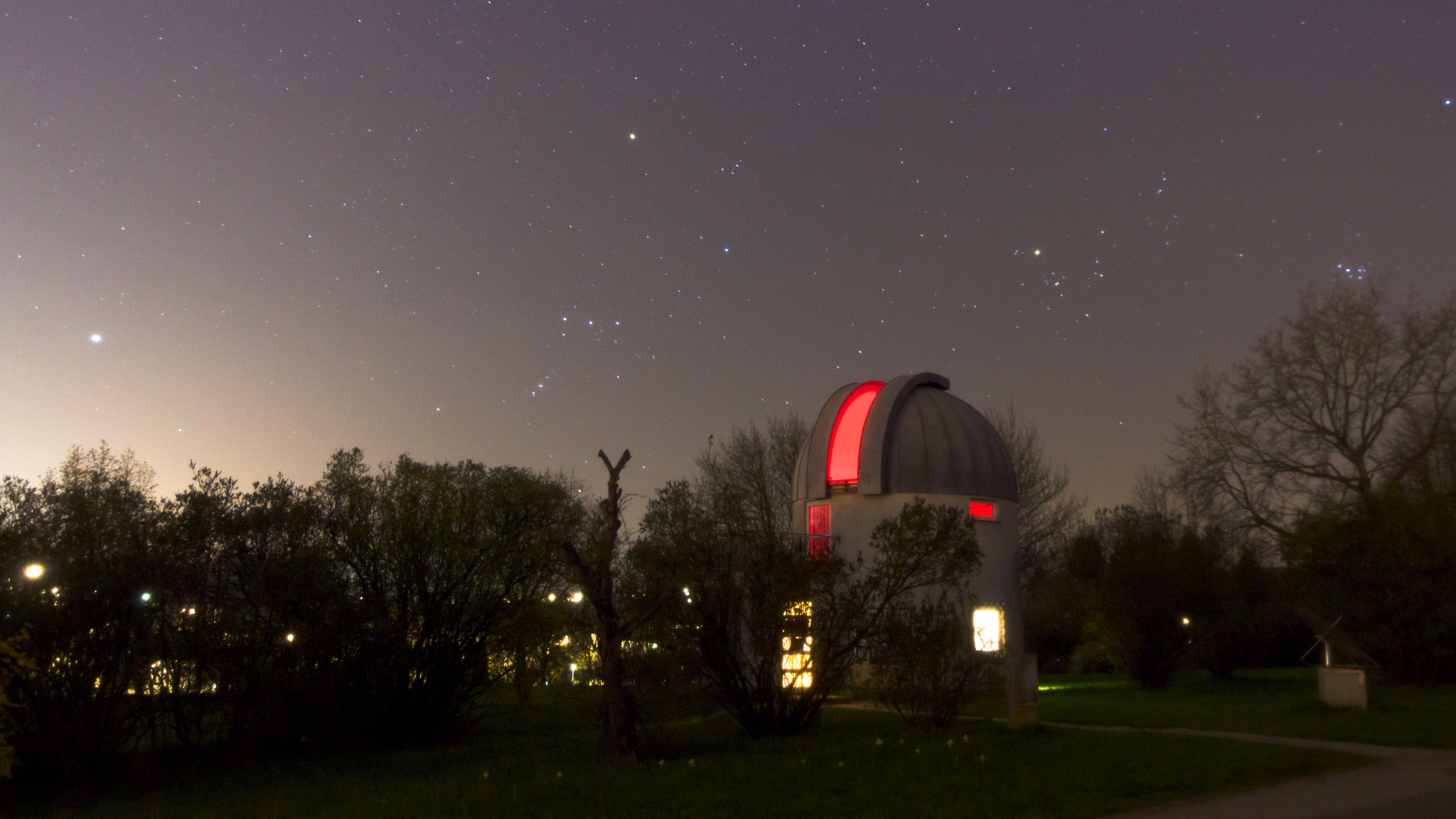
Sirius is the fixed star with the greatest apparent magnitude and one which is almost non-variable. The Pleiades, a key feature of Taurus shown across Orion in the same photograph also experience an annual period of visibility ("rising and setting"). Photo taken at sunset.

Relative to the stars, the Sun appears to drift eastward about one degree per day along a path called the ecliptic because there are 360 degrees in any complete revolution (circle), which takes about 365 days in the case of one revolution of the Earth around the Sun. The star's heliacal rising will occur when the Earth has moved to a point in its orbit where the star appears on the eastern horizon at dawn. Each day after the heliacal rising, the star will rise slightly earlier and remain visible for longer before the light from the rising sun overwhelms it. Over the following days the star will move further and further westward (about one degree per day) relative to the Sun, until eventually it is no longer visible in the sky at sunrise because it has already set below the western horizon. This is called the acronycal setting.

The same star will reappear in the eastern sky at dawn approximately one year after its previous heliacal rising. For stars near the ecliptic, the small difference between the solar and sidereal years due to axial precession will cause their heliacal rising to recur about one sidereal year (about 365.2564 days) later, though this depends on its proper motion. For stars far from the ecliptic, the period is somewhat different and varies slowly, but in any case the heliacal rising will move all the way through the zodiac in about 26,000 years due to precession of the equinoxes.

Because the heliacal rising depends on the observation of the object, its exact timing can be dependent on weather conditions.

Heliacal phenomena and their use throughout history have made them useful points of reference in archeoastronomy.

== Non-application to circumpolar stars ==
Some stars, when viewed from latitudes not at the equator, do not rise or set. These are circumpolar stars, which are either always in the sky or never. For example, the North Star (Polaris) is not visible in Australia and the Southern Cross is not seen in Europe, because they always stay below the respective horizons.

The term circumpolar is somewhat localised as between the Tropic of Cancer and the Equator, the Southern polar constellations have a brief spell of annual visibility (thus "heliacal" rising and "cosmic" setting) and the same applies as to the other polar constellations in respect of the reverse tropic.

== History ==
Constellations containing stars that rise and set were incorporated into early calendars or zodiacs. The Sumerians, Babylonians, Egyptians, and Greeks all used the heliacal risings of various stars for the timing of agricultural activities.

Because of its position about 40° off the ecliptic, the heliacal risings of the bright star Sirius in Ancient Egypt occurred not over a period of exactly one sidereal year but over a period called the "Sothic year" (from "Sothis", the name for the star Sirius). The Sothic year was about a minute longer than a Julian year of 365.25 days. Since the development of civilization, this has occurred at Cairo approximately on July 19 on the Julian calendar. (Note: The exact date varies with latitude, so that Sirius's return is observed about 8–10 days later on the Mediterranean coast than at Aswan. Official observations were made at Heliopolis or Memphis near Cairo, Thebes, and Elephantine near Aswan. The date at any location also slowly varies within the Gregorian calendar by about three days every four centuries. July 19 of the Julian Calendar occurs on August 1 Gregorian in the 20th and 21st centuries.) Its returns also roughly corresponded to the onset of the annual flooding of the Nile, although the flooding is based on the tropical year and so would occur about three quarters of a day earlier per century in the Julian or Sothic year. (July 19, 1000 BC in the Julian Calendar is July 10 in the proleptic Gregorian Calendar. At that time, the sun would be somewhere near Regulus in Leo, where it is around August 21 in the 2020s.) The ancient Egyptians appear to have constructed their 365-day civil calendar at a time when Wep Renpet, its New Year, corresponded with Sirius's return to the night sky. Although this calendar's lack of leap years caused the event to shift one day every four years or so, astronomical records of this displacement led to the discovery of the Sothic cycle and, later, the establishment of the more accurate Julian and Alexandrian calendars.

The Egyptians also devised a method of telling the time at night based on the heliacal risings of 36 decan stars, one for each 10° segment of the 360° circle of the zodiac and corresponding to the ten-day "weeks" of their civil calendar.

To the Māori of New Zealand, the Pleiades are called Matariki, and their heliacal rising signifies the beginning of the new year (around June). The Mapuche of South America called the Pleiades Ngauponi which in the vicinity of the we tripantu (Mapuche new year) will disappear by the west, lafkenmapu or ngulumapu, appearing at dawn to the East, a few days before the birth of new life in nature. Heliacal rising of Ngauponi, i.e. appearance of the Pleiades by the horizon over an hour before the sun approximately 12 days before the winter solstice, announced we tripantu.

When a planet has a heliacal rising, there is a conjunction with the sun beforehand. Depending on the type of conjunction, there may be a syzygy, eclipse, transit, or occultation of the sun.

== Acronycal and cosmic(al) ==
The rising of a planet above the eastern horizon at sunset is called its acronycal rising, which for a superior planet signifies an opposition, another type of syzygy. When the Moon has an acronycal rising, it will occur near full moon and thus, two or three times a year, a noticeable lunar eclipse.

Cosmic(al) can refer to rising with sunrise or setting at sunset, or the first setting at morning twilight.

Risings and settings are furthermore differentiated between apparent (the above discussed) and actual or true risings or settings.

=== Overview ===
The use of the terms cosmical and acronycal is not consistent. The following table gives an overview of the different application of the terms to the rising and setting instances.

Daytime	Visibility	Rising (east)	Setting (west)
Morning (matutinal)	True (in daylight)	Cosmical	Acronycal/Cosmical
Morning (matutinal)	Apparent (in twilight)	Heliacal (first night sky appearance)	Heliacal/Cosmical (last morning appearance)
Evening (vesper)	True (in daylight)	Acronycal	Cosmical/Acronycal
Evening (vesper)	Apparent (in twilight)	Heliacal/Acronycal (first evening appearance)	Heliacal (last night sky appearance)

== See also ==
- Dog days
- Steering star
