= Star people =

Star people may refer to:

- Extraterrestrial life
- Star people (New Age), individuals who believe they might have originated from another world, dimension, or planet

Literature

- The Eldar, an elven race in J. R. R. Tolkien's Sundering of the Elves
- Star People, mythological creatures from the fantasy Narnia world of C. S. Lewis
- Star People, a 2006 novel by Paul Burston
- Stars, immortal humanoid supernatural race from the 1999 fantasy novel Stardust by Neil Gaiman

Music

- Star People, a 1983 album by Miles Davis
- Star People, a 1996 song on the Older album by George Michael
- Star People, a 2002(?) album by Brulé
- Star People, a music record label
