= Sirius =

Brightest star in Earth's night sky

- Location of Sirius (circled)

Observation data Epoch J2000 Equinox ICRS
- Constellation: Canis Major
- Pronunciation: /ˈsɪriəs/
- Sirius A
- Right ascension: 06^{h} 45^{m} 08.917^{s}
- Declination: −16° 42′ 58.02″
- Apparent magnitude (V): −1.46
- Sirius B
- Right ascension: 06^{h} 45^{m} 09.0^{s}
- Declination: −16° 43′ 06″
- Apparent magnitude (V): 8.44

Characteristics

Sirius A
- Evolutionary stage: Main sequence
- Spectral type: A0mA1 Va
- U−B colour index: −0.05
- B−V colour index: +0.00

Sirius B
- Evolutionary stage: White dwarf
- Spectral type: DA2
- U−B colour index: −1.04
- B−V colour index: −0.03

Astrometry
Radial velocity (R_{v})	−5.50 km/s

Sirius A
Proper motion (μ)	RA: −546.01 mas/yr Dec.: −1,223.07 mas/yr
Parallax (π)	378.9±1.4 mas
Distance	8.61 ± 0.03 ly (2.639 ± 0.010 pc)
Absolute magnitude (M_{V})	+1.43

Sirius B
Proper motion (μ)	RA: −461.571 mas/yr Dec.: −914.520 mas/yr
Parallax (π)	378.9±1.4 mas
Distance	8.61 ± 0.03 ly (2.639 ± 0.010 pc)
Absolute magnitude (M_{V})	+11.18

Orbit
Primary	α Canis Majoris A
Secondary	α Canis Majoris B
Period (P)	50.1284±0.0043 yr
Semi-major axis (a)	7.4957±0.0025" (19.8 AU (Note: Semi-major axis in AU = (semimajor axis in seconds)/ parallax = 7.56″/0.37921 = 19.8 AU; as the eccentricity is 0.6, the distance fluctuates between 40% and 160% of that, roughly from 8 AU to 32 AU.))
Eccentricity (e)	0.59142±0.00037
Inclination (i)	136.336±0.040°
Longitude of the node (Ω)	45.400±0.071°
Periastron epoch (T)	1994.5715±0.0058
Argument of periastron (ω) (secondary)	149.161±0.075°

Details

Sirius A
Mass	2.063±0.023 M_{☉}
Radius	1.7144±0.0090 R_{☉}
Luminosity	24.74±0.70 L_{☉}
Surface gravity (log g)	4.33 cgs
Temperature	9,845±64 K
Metallicity [Fe/H]	0.50 dex
Rotational velocity (v sin i)	16.3±0.1 km/s
Age	242±5 Myr

Sirius B
Mass	1.018±0.011 M_{☉}
Radius	0.008098±0.6% R_{☉}
Radius	5,634±34 km
Luminosity	0.02448±1.3% L_{☉}
Surface gravity (log g)	8.591±0.016 cgs
Temperature	25,369±46 K
Age	228+10 −8 Myr

Other designations
- Dog Star, Aschere, Canicula, Al Shira, Sothis, Alhabor, Mrgavyadha, Lubdhaka, Tenrōsei, α Canis Majoris (α CMa), 9 Canis Majoris (9 CMa), HD 48915, HR 2491, BD−16°1591, GJ 244, LHS 219, ADS 5423, LTT 2638, HIP 32349
- Sirius B: EGGR 49, WD 0642-166, GCTP 1577.00

Database references
SIMBAD	A
- B

Sirius is the brightest star in the night sky, located in the southern constellation of Canis Major. Its name is derived from the Ancient Greek word Σείριος (Latin script: Seirios; lit. 'glowing' or 'scorching'). The star is designated α Canis Majoris, Romanized to Alpha Canis Majoris, and abbreviated α CMa or Alpha CMa. With a visual apparent magnitude of −1.46, Sirius is almost twice as bright as Canopus, the next brightest star. Sirius is a binary star consisting of a main-sequence star of spectral type A0 or A1, termed Sirius A, and a faint white dwarf companion of spectral type DA2, termed Sirius B. The distance between the two varies between 8.2 and 31.5 astronomical units as they orbit every 50 years.

Sirius appears bright because of its intrinsic luminosity and its proximity to the Solar System. At a distance of 2.64 parsecs (8.6 ly), the Sirius system is one of Earth's nearest neighbours. Sirius is gradually moving closer to the Solar System and it is expected to increase in brightness slightly over the next 60,000 years to reach a peak magnitude of −1.68. Coincidentally, at about the same time, Sirius will take its turn as the southern Pole Star, around the year 66,270 AD. In that year, Sirius will come to within 1.6 degrees of the south celestial pole. This is due to axial precession and proper motion of Sirius itself which moves slowly in the SSW direction, so it will be visible from the southern hemisphere only. After that time, its distance will begin to increase, and it will become fainter, but it will continue to be the brightest star in the Earth's night sky for approximately the next 210,000 years, at which point Vega, another A-type star that is intrinsically more luminous than Sirius, becomes the brightest star.

Sirius A is about twice as massive as the Sun (M_{☉}) and has an absolute visual magnitude of +1.43. It is 25 times as luminous as the Sun, but has a significantly lower luminosity than other bright stars such as Canopus, Betelgeuse, and Rigel. The system is between 200 and 300 million years old. It was originally composed of two bright bluish stars. The initially more massive of these, Sirius B, consumed its hydrogen fuel and became a red giant before shedding its outer layers and collapsing into its current state as a white dwarf around 120 million years ago.

Sirius is colloquially known as the "Dog Star", reflecting its prominence in its constellation, Canis Major (the Greater Dog). The heliacal rising of Sirius marked the flooding of the Nile in Ancient Egypt and the "dog days" of summer for the ancient Greeks, while to the Polynesians, mostly in the Southern Hemisphere, the star marked winter and was an important reference for their navigation around the Pacific Ocean.

== Etymology ==
The proper name "Sirius" comes from the Latin Sīrius, from the Ancient Greek Σείριος (Seirios, "glowing" or "scorcher"). The Greek word itself may have been imported from elsewhere before the Archaic period, one authority suggesting a link with the Egyptian god Osiris. The name's earliest recorded use dates from the 7th century BC in Hesiod's poetic work Works and Days. In 2016, the International Astronomical Union organized a Working Group on Star Names (WGSN) to catalog and standardize proper names for stars. The WGSN's first bulletin of July 2016 included a table of the first two batches of names approved by the WGSN, which included Sirius for the star α Canis Majoris A. It is now so entered in the IAU Catalog of Star Names.

Sirius has over 50 other designations and names attached to it. In Geoffrey Chaucer's essay Treatise on the Astrolabe, it bears the name Alhabor and is depicted by a hound's head. This name is widely used on medieval astrolabes from Western Europe, and is derived from the Arabic al-’abūr, meaning "the one who crossed over". In Sanskrit it is known as मृगव्याध (Mŕgavyādh, "deer hunter"), or व्याध (Vyādh, "hunter"). As Mrgavyadha, the star represents Rudra (Shiva). The star is referred to as Makarajyoti in Malayalam and has religious significance to the pilgrim center Sabarimala. In Scandinavia, the star has been known as Lokabrenna ("burning done by Loki", or "Loki's torch"). In the astrology of the Middle Ages, Sirius was a Behenian fixed star, associated with beryl and juniper. Its astrological symbol was listed by Heinrich Cornelius Agrippa.

== Observational history ==
A drawing of Sopdet, Egyptian goddess of Sirius and the fertility of the Nile, pictured with a star upon her head

X1 N14 M44
Sirius
Spdt
in hieroglyphs

As the brightest star in the night sky, Sirius appears in some of the earliest astronomical records. Its displacement from the ecliptic causes its heliacal rising to be remarkably regular compared to other stars, with a period of almost exactly 365.25 days, holding it constant relative to the solar year. This rising occurs at Cairo on 19 July (Julian), placing it just before the onset of the annual flooding of the Nile during antiquity. Owing to the flood's own irregularity, the extreme precision of the star's return made it important to the ancient Egyptians, who worshipped it as the goddess Sopdet (Ancient Egyptian: Spdt, "Triangle"; (Note: Compare the meaning of the Egyptian name with Sirius's completion of the Winter Triangle asterism, joining the other two brightest stars of the northern winter sky, Betelgeuse and Procyon.) Ancient Greek: Σῶθις}, Sō̂this), guarantor of the fertility of their land (see Sothic cycle). As Sirius is visible together with the constellation of Orion, the Egyptians worshiped Orion as the god Sah, the husband of Sopdet, with whom she had a son, the sky god Sopdu. The goddess Sopdet was later syncretized with the goddess Isis, Sah was linked with Osiris (which is by some suggested as a root for the name of Sirius), and Sopdu was linked with Horus. The joining of Sopdet with Isis would allow Plutarch to state that "The soul of Isis is called Dog by the Greeks", meaning Sirius worshiped as Isis-Sopdet by Egyptians was named the Dog by the Greeks and Romans. The 70 day period of the absence of Sirius from the sky was understood as the passing of Sopdet-Isis and Sah-Osiris through the Egyptian underworld.

The ancient Greeks observed that the appearance of Sirius as the morning star heralded the hot and dry summer and feared that the star caused plants to wilt, men to weaken, and women to become aroused. Owing to its brightness, Sirius would have been seen to twinkle more in the unsettled weather conditions of early summer. To Greek observers, this signified emanations that caused its malignant influence. Anyone suffering its effects was said to be "star-struck" (ἀστροβόλητος, astrobólētos). It was described as "burning" or "flaming" in literature. The season following the star's reappearance came to be known as the "dog days". The inhabitants of the island of Ceos in the Aegean Sea would offer sacrifices to Sirius and Zeus to bring cooling breezes and would await the reappearance of the star in summer. If it rose clear, it would portend good fortune; if it was misty or faint then it foretold (or emanated) pestilence. Coins retrieved from the island from the 3rd century BC feature dogs or stars with emanating rays, highlighting Sirius's importance.

The Romans celebrated the heliacal setting of Sirius around 25 April, sacrificing a dog, along with incense, wine, and a sheep, to the goddess Robigo so that the star's emanations would not cause wheat rust on wheat crops that year.

Bright stars were important to the ancient Polynesians for navigation of the Pacific Ocean. They also served as latitude markers; the declination of Sirius matches the latitude of the archipelago of Fiji at 17°S and thus passes directly over the islands each sidereal day. Sirius served as the body of a "Great Bird" constellation called Manu, with Canopus as the southern wingtip and Procyon the northern wingtip, which divided the Polynesian night sky into two hemispheres. Just as the appearance of Sirius in the morning sky marked summer in Greece, it marked the onset of winter for the Māori, whose name Takurua described both the star and the season. Its culmination at the winter solstice was marked by celebration in Hawaii, where it was known as Ka'ulua, "Queen of Heaven". Many other Polynesian names have been recorded, including Tau-ua in the Marquesas Islands, Rehua in New Zealand, and Ta'urua-fau-papa "Festivity of original high chiefs" and Ta'urua-e-hiti-i-te-tara-te-feiai "Festivity who rises with prayers and religious ceremonies" in Tahiti.

=== Kinematics ===
In 1717, Edmond Halley discovered the proper motion of the hitherto presumed fixed stars after comparing contemporary astrometric measurements with those from the second century AD given in Ptolemy's Almagest. The bright stars Aldebaran, Arcturus and Sirius were noted to have moved significantly; Sirius had progressed about 30 arcminutes (about the diameter of the Moon) to the southwest.

In 1868, Sirius became the first star to have its velocity measured, the beginning of the study of celestial radial velocities. Sir William Huggins examined the spectrum of the star and observed a red shift. He concluded that Sirius was receding from the Solar System at about 40 km/s. Compared to the modern value of −5.5 km/s, this was an overestimate and had the wrong sign; the minus sign (−) means that it is approaching the Sun.

=== Distance ===
In his 1698 book, Cosmotheoros, Christiaan Huygens estimated the distance to Sirius at 27,664 times the distance from the Earth to the Sun (about 0.437 light-year, translating to a parallax of roughly 7.5 arcseconds). There were several unsuccessful attempts to measure the parallax of Sirius: by Jacques Cassini (6 seconds); by some astronomers (including Nevil Maskelyne) using Lacaille's observations made at the Cape of Good Hope (4 seconds); by Piazzi (the same amount); using Lacaille's observations made at Paris, more numerous and certain than those made at the Cape (no sensible parallax); by Bessel (no sensible parallax).

Scottish astronomer Thomas Henderson used his observations made in 1832–1833 and South African astronomer Thomas Maclear's observations made in 1836–1837, to determine that the value of the parallax was 0.23 arcsecond, and error of the parallax was estimated not to exceed a quarter of a second, or as Henderson wrote in 1839, "On the whole we may conclude that the parallax of Sirius is not greater than half a second in space; and that it is probably much less." Astronomers adopted a value of 0.25 arcsecond for much of the 19th century. It is now known to have a parallax of nearly 0.4 arcseconds.

The Hipparcos parallax for Sirius indicates a distance of 8.60 light years, statistically accurate to plus or minus 0.04 light years. Sirius B is generally assumed to be at the same distance. Sirius B has a Gaia Data Release 3 parallax with a much smaller statistical margin of error, giving a distance of 8.709±0.005 light years, but it is flagged as having a very large value for astrometric excess noise, which indicates that the parallax value may be unreliable.

=== Discovery of Sirius B ===
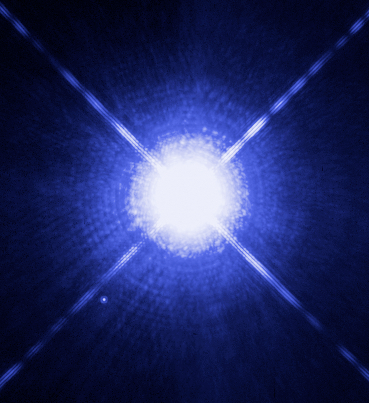
Hubble Space Telescope image of Sirius A and Sirius B. The white dwarf can be seen to the lower left. The diffraction spikes and concentric rings are instrumental effects. Sirius A is approximately one thousand times brighter than Sirius B.

In a letter dated 10 August 1844, the German astronomer Friedrich Wilhelm Bessel deduced from changes in the proper motion of Sirius that it had an unseen companion. On 31 January 1862, American telescope-maker and astronomer Alvan Graham Clark first observed the faint companion, which is now called Sirius B. This happened during testing of an 18.5-inch (470 mm) aperture great refractor telescope for Dearborn Observatory, which was one of the largest refracting telescope lenses in existence at the time, and the largest telescope in the United States. Sirius B's sighting was confirmed on March 8, 1862 with smaller telescopes.

The visible star is now sometimes known as Sirius A. Since 1894, some apparent orbital irregularities in the Sirius system have been observed, suggesting a third very small companion star, but this has never been confirmed. The best fit to the data indicates a six-year orbit around Sirius A and a mass of 0.06 M_{☉}. This star would be five to ten magnitudes fainter than the white dwarf Sirius B, which would make it difficult to observe. Observations published in 2008 were unable to detect either a third star or a planet. An apparent "third star" observed in the 1920s is now believed to be a background object.

In 1915, Walter Sydney Adams, using a 60-inch (1.5 m) reflector at Mount Wilson Observatory, observed the spectrum of Sirius B and determined that it was a faint whitish star. This led astronomers to conclude that it was a white dwarf—the second to be discovered. The diameter of Sirius A was first measured by Robert Hanbury Brown and Richard Q. Twiss in 1959 at Jodrell Bank using their stellar intensity interferometer. In 2005, using the Hubble Space Telescope, astronomers determined that Sirius B has nearly the diameter of the Earth, 12,000 kilometres (7,500 mi), with a mass 102% of the Sun's.

=== Colour controversy ===
Twinkling of Sirius (apparent magnitude = −1.5) in the evening shortly before upper culmination on the southern meridian at a height of 20 degrees above the horizon. During 29 seconds Sirius moves on an arc of 7.5 minutes from the left to the right.

Around the year 150 AD, Claudius Ptolemy of Alexandria, an ethnic Greek Egyptian astronomer of the Roman period, mapped the stars in Books VII and VIII of his Almagest, in which he used Sirius as the location for the globe's central meridian. He described Sirius as reddish, along with five other stars, Betelgeuse, Antares, Aldebaran, Arcturus, and Pollux, all of which are at present observed to be of orange or red hue. The discrepancy was first noted by amateur astronomer Thomas Barker, squire of Lyndon Hall in Rutland, who prepared a paper and spoke at a meeting of the Royal Society in London in 1760. The existence of other stars changing in brightness gave credibility to the idea that some may change in colour too; Sir John Herschel noted this in 1839, possibly influenced by witnessing Eta Carinae two years earlier. Thomas J.J. See resurrected discussion on red Sirius with the publication of several papers in 1892, and a final summary in 1926. He cited not only Ptolemy but also the poet Aratus, the orator Cicero, and general Germanicus all calling the star red, though acknowledging that none of the latter three authors were astronomers, the last two merely translating Aratus's poem Phaenomena. Seneca had described Sirius as being of a deeper red than Mars. It is therefore possible that the description as red is a poetic metaphor for ill fortune. In 1985, German astronomers Wolfhard Schlosser and Werner Bergmann published an account of an 8th-century Lombardic manuscript, which contains De cursu stellarum ratio by St. Gregory of Tours. The Latin text taught readers how to determine the times of nighttime prayers from positions of the stars, and a bright star described as rubeola ("reddish") was claimed to be Sirius. The authors proposed this as evidence that Sirius B had been a red giant at the time of observation. Other scholars replied that it was likely St. Gregory had been referring to Arcturus.

It is notable that not all ancient observers saw Sirius as red. The 1st-century poet Marcus Manilius described it as "sea-blue", as did the 4th-century Avienius. Furthermore, Sirius was consistently reported as a white star in ancient China: a detailed re-evaluation of Chinese texts from the 2nd century BC up to the 7th century AD concluded that all such reliable sources are consistent with Sirius being white.

Nevertheless, historical accounts referring to Sirius as red are sufficiently extensive to lead researchers to seek possible physical explanations. Proposed theories fall into two categories: intrinsic and extrinsic. Intrinsic theories postulate a real change in the Sirius system over the past two millennia, of which the most widely discussed is the proposal that the white dwarf Sirius B was a red giant as recently as 2000 years ago. Extrinsic theories are concerned with the possibility of transient reddening in an intervening medium through which the star is observed, such as might be caused by dust in the interstellar medium, or by particles in the terrestrial atmosphere.

The possibility that stellar evolution of either Sirius A or Sirius B could be responsible for the discrepancy has been rejected on the grounds that the timescale of thousands of years is orders of magnitude too short and that there is no sign of the nebulosity in the system that would be expected had such a change taken place. Similarly, the presence of a third star sufficiently luminous to affect the visible colour of the system in recent millennia is inconsistent with observational evidence. Intrinsic theories may therefore be disregarded. Extrinsic theories based on reddening by interstellar dust are similarly implausible. A transient dust cloud passing between the Sirius system and an observer on Earth would indeed redden the appearance of the star to some degree, but reddening sufficient to cause it to appear similar in colour to intrinsically red bright stars such as Betelgeuse and Arcturus would also dim the star by several magnitudes, inconsistent with historical accounts: indeed, the dimming would be sufficient to render the colour of the star imperceptible to the human eye without the aid of a telescope.

Extrinsic theories based on optical effects in the Earth's atmosphere are better supported by available evidence. Scintillations caused by atmospheric turbulence result in rapid, transient changes in the apparent colour of the star, especially when observed near the horizon, although with no particular preference for red. However, systematic reddening of the star's light results from absorption and scattering by particles in the atmosphere, exactly analogous to the redness of the Sun at sunrise and sunset. Because the particles that cause reddening in the Earth's atmosphere are different (typically much smaller) than those that cause reddening in the interstellar medium, there is far less dimming of the starlight, and in the case of Sirius the change in colour can be seen without the aid of a telescope. There may be cultural reasons to explain why some ancient observers might have reported the colour of Sirius preferentially when it was situated low in the sky (and therefore apparently red). In several Mediterranean cultures, the local visibility of Sirius at heliacal rising and setting (whether it appeared bright and clear or dimmed) was thought to have astrological significance and was thus subject to systematic observation and intense interest. Thus Sirius, more than any other star, was observed and recorded while close to the horizon. Other contemporary cultures, such as Chinese, lacking this tradition, recorded Sirius only as white.

== Observation ==
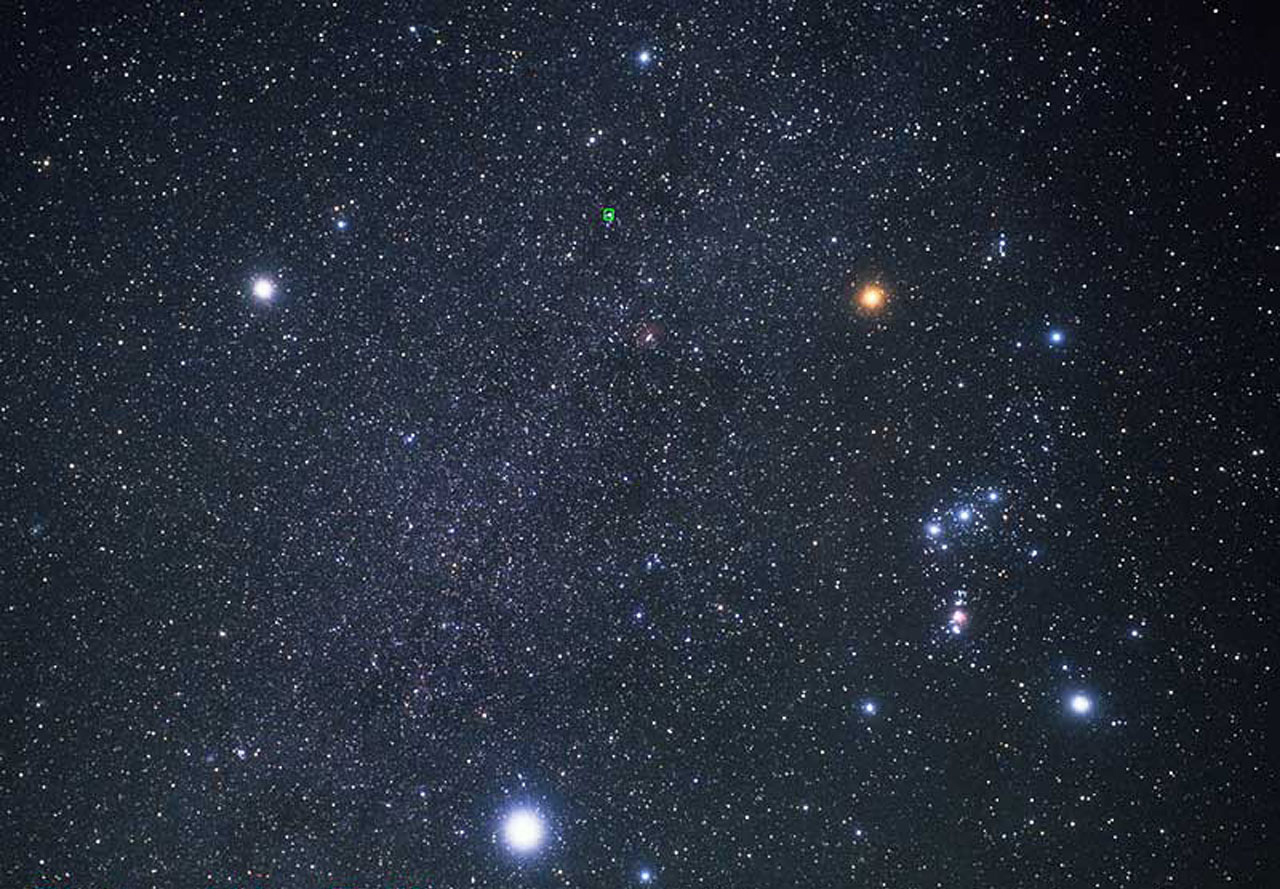
Sirius (bottom) and the constellation Orion (right). The three brightest stars in this image—Sirius, Betelgeuse (top right) and Procyon (top left)—form the Winter Triangle. The bright star at top center is Alhena, which forms a cross-shaped asterism with the Winter Triangle.

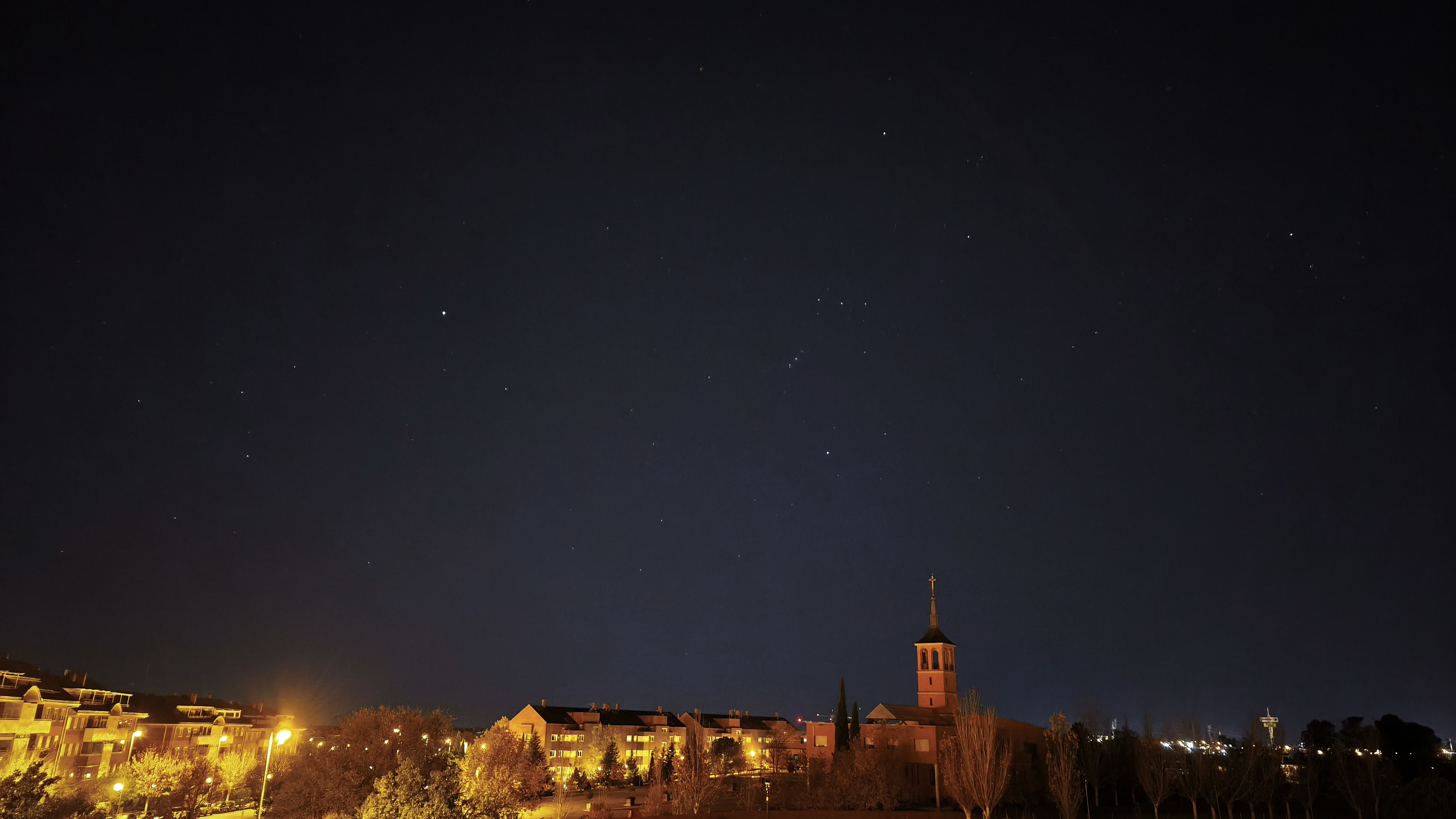
The constellations Canis Major (left) and Orion as seen with the naked eye. Sirius, left of centre, is the brightest star.

With an apparent magnitude of −1.46, Sirius is the brightest star in the night sky, almost twice as bright as the second-brightest star, Canopus. From Earth, Sirius always appears dimmer than Jupiter and Venus, and at certain times also dimmer than Mercury and Mars. Sirius is visible from almost everywhere on Earth, except latitudes north of 73° N, and it does not rise very high when viewed from some northern cities (reaching only 13° above the horizon from Saint Petersburg). Because of its declination of roughly −17°, Sirius is a circumpolar star from latitudes south of 73° S. From the Southern Hemisphere in early July, Sirius can be seen in both the evening where it sets after the Sun and in the morning where it rises before the Sun. Along with Procyon and Betelgeuse, Sirius forms one of the three vertices of the Winter Triangle to observers in the Northern Hemisphere.

Sirius can be observed in daylight with the naked eye under the right conditions. Ideally, the sky should be very clear, with the observer at a high altitude, the star passing overhead, and the Sun low on the horizon. These conditions are most easily met around sunset in March and April, and around sunrise in September and October. Observing conditions are more favorable in the Southern Hemisphere, owing to the southerly declination of Sirius.

The orbital motion of the Sirius binary system brings the two stars to a minimum angular separation of 3 arcseconds and a maximum of 11 arcseconds. At the closest approach, it is an observational challenge to distinguish the white dwarf from its more luminous companion, requiring a telescope with at least 300 mm (12 in) aperture and excellent seeing conditions. After a periastron occurred in 1994, (Note: Two full 50.09 year orbits following the periastron epoch of 1894.13 gives a date of 1994.31.) the pair moved apart, making them easier to separate with a telescope. Apoastron occurred in 2019, (Note: Two and one-half 50.09 year orbits following the periastron epoch of 1894.13 gives a date of 2019.34 .) but from the Earth's vantage point, the greatest observational separation occurred in 2023, with an angular separation of 11.333″.

== Location ==
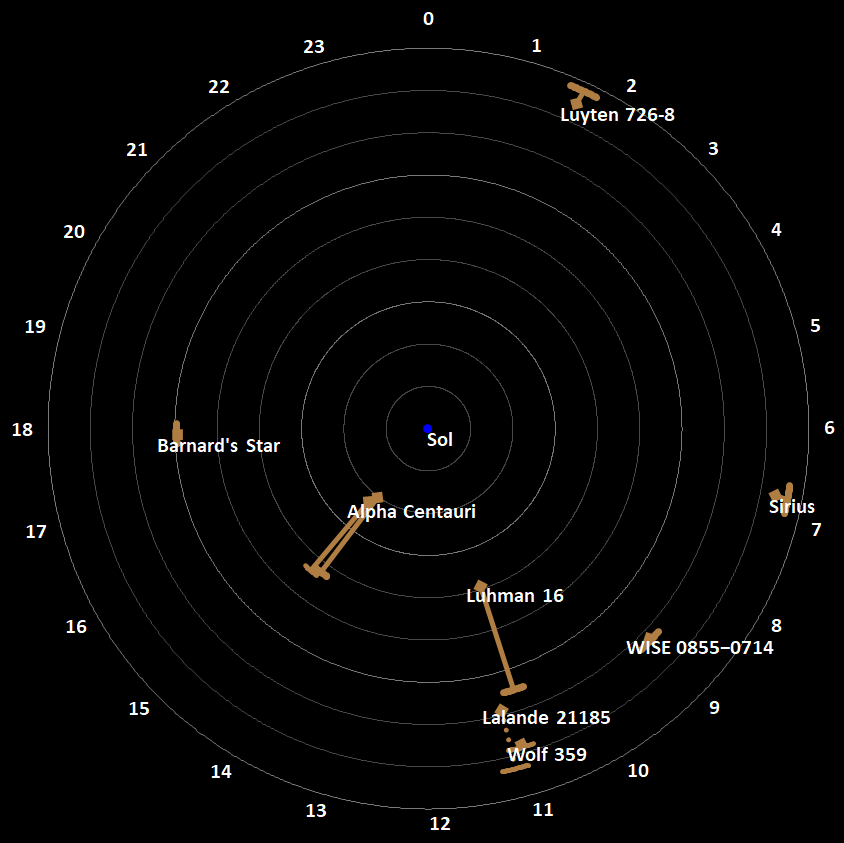
The position of Sirius on a radar map among all stellar objects or stellar systems within 9 light years (ly) from the map's center, the Sun (Sol). The diamond-shapes are their positions entered according to right ascension in hours angle (indicated at the edge of the map's reference disc), and according to their declination. The second mark shows each's distance from Sol, with the concentric circles indicating the distance in steps of one ly.

At a distance of 2.6 parsecs (8.6 ly), the Sirius system contains two of the eight nearest stars to the Sun, and it is the fifth closest stellar system to the Sun. This proximity is the main reason for its brightness, as with other near stars such as Alpha Centauri, Procyon and Vega and in contrast to distant, highly luminous supergiants such as Canopus, Rigel or Betelgeuse (although Canopus may be a bright giant). It is still around 25 times more luminous than the Sun. The closest large neighbouring star to Sirius is Procyon, 1.61 parsecs (5.24 ly) away. The Voyager 2 spacecraft, launched in 1977 to study the four giant planets in the Solar System, is expected to pass within 4.3 light-years (1.3 pc) of Sirius in approximately 296,000 years.

== Stellar system ==
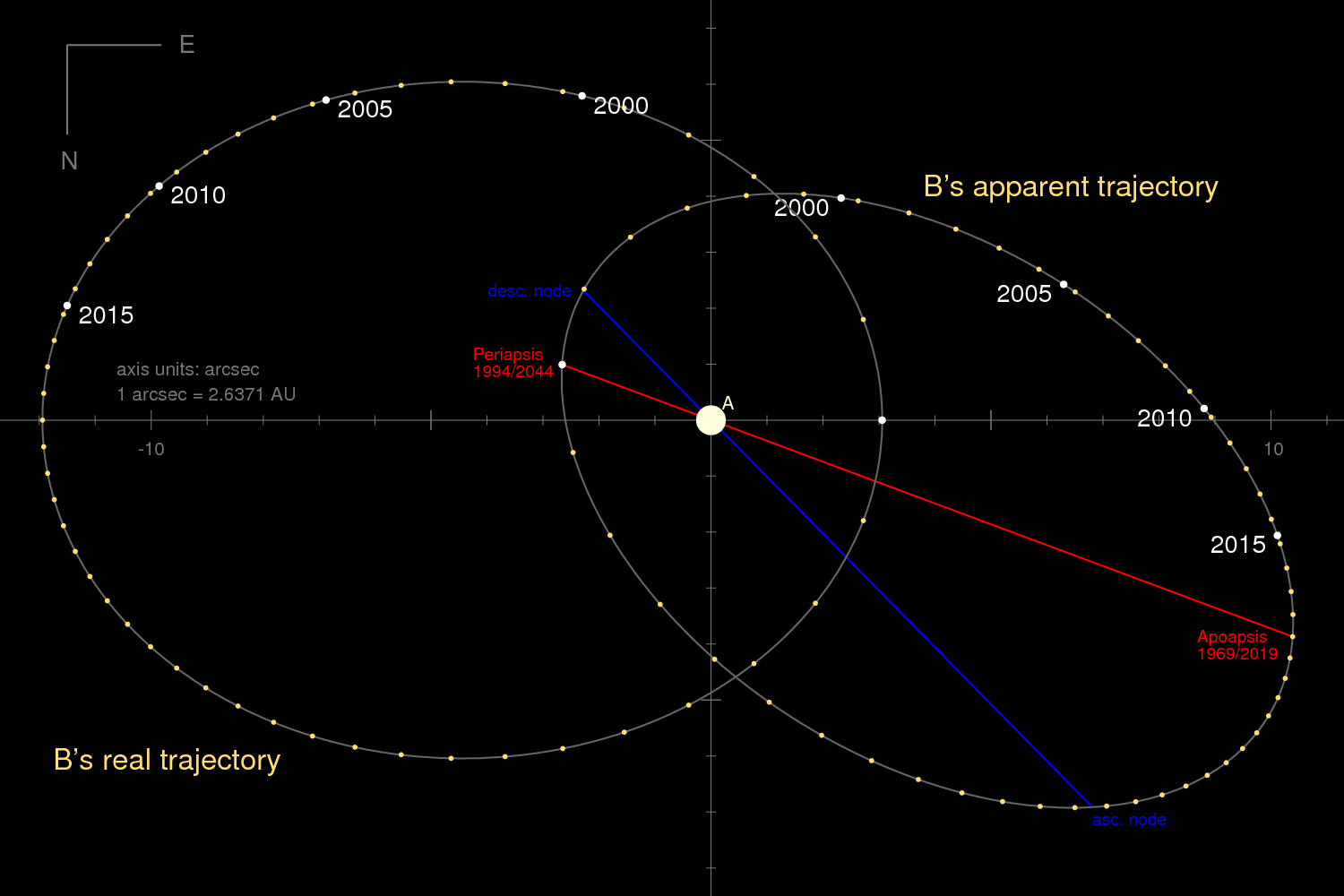
The orbit of Sirius B around A, as seen from Earth (slanted ellipse). The wide horizontal ellipse shows the true shape of the orbit (with an arbitrary orientation) as it would appear if viewed straight on.

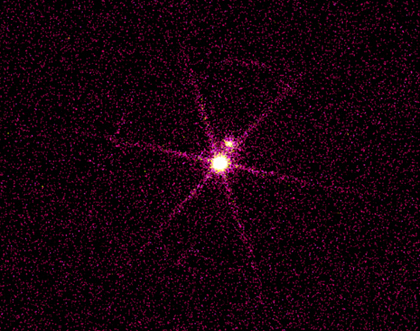
A Chandra X-ray Observatory image of the Sirius star system, where the spike-like pattern is due to the support structure for the transmission grating. The brighter source is Sirius B. Credit: NASA/SAO/CXC

Sirius is a binary star system consisting of two white stars orbiting each other with a separation of about 20 AU (Note: Semi-major axis in AU = (semimajor axis in seconds)/ parallax = 7.56″/0.37921 = 19.8 AU; as the eccentricity is 0.6, the distance fluctuates between 40% and 160% of that, roughly from 8 AU to 32 AU.) (roughly the distance between the Sun and Uranus) and a period of 50.1 years. The brighter component, termed Sirius A, is a main-sequence star of spectral type early A, with an estimated surface temperature of 9,940 K. Its companion, Sirius B, is a star that has already evolved off the main sequence and become a white dwarf. Currently 1/10,000 as luminous in the visual spectrum, Sirius B was once the more massive of the two. The age of the system has been estimated at 230 million years. Early in its life, it is thought to have been two bluish-white stars orbiting each other in an elliptical orbit every 9.1 years. The system emits a higher than expected level of infrared radiation, as measured by IRAS space-based observatory. This might be an indication of dust in the system, which is considered somewhat unusual for a binary star. The Chandra X-ray Observatory image shows Sirius B outshining its partner as an X-ray source.

In 2015, Vigan and colleagues used the VLT Survey Telescope to search for evidence of substellar companions, and were able to rule out the presence of giant planets 11 times more massive than Jupiter at 0.5 AU distance from Sirius A, 6–7 times the mass of Jupiter at 1–2 AU distance, and down to around 4 times the mass of Jupiter at 10 AU distance. Similarly, Lucas and colleagues did not detect any companions around Sirius B.

=== Sirius A ===
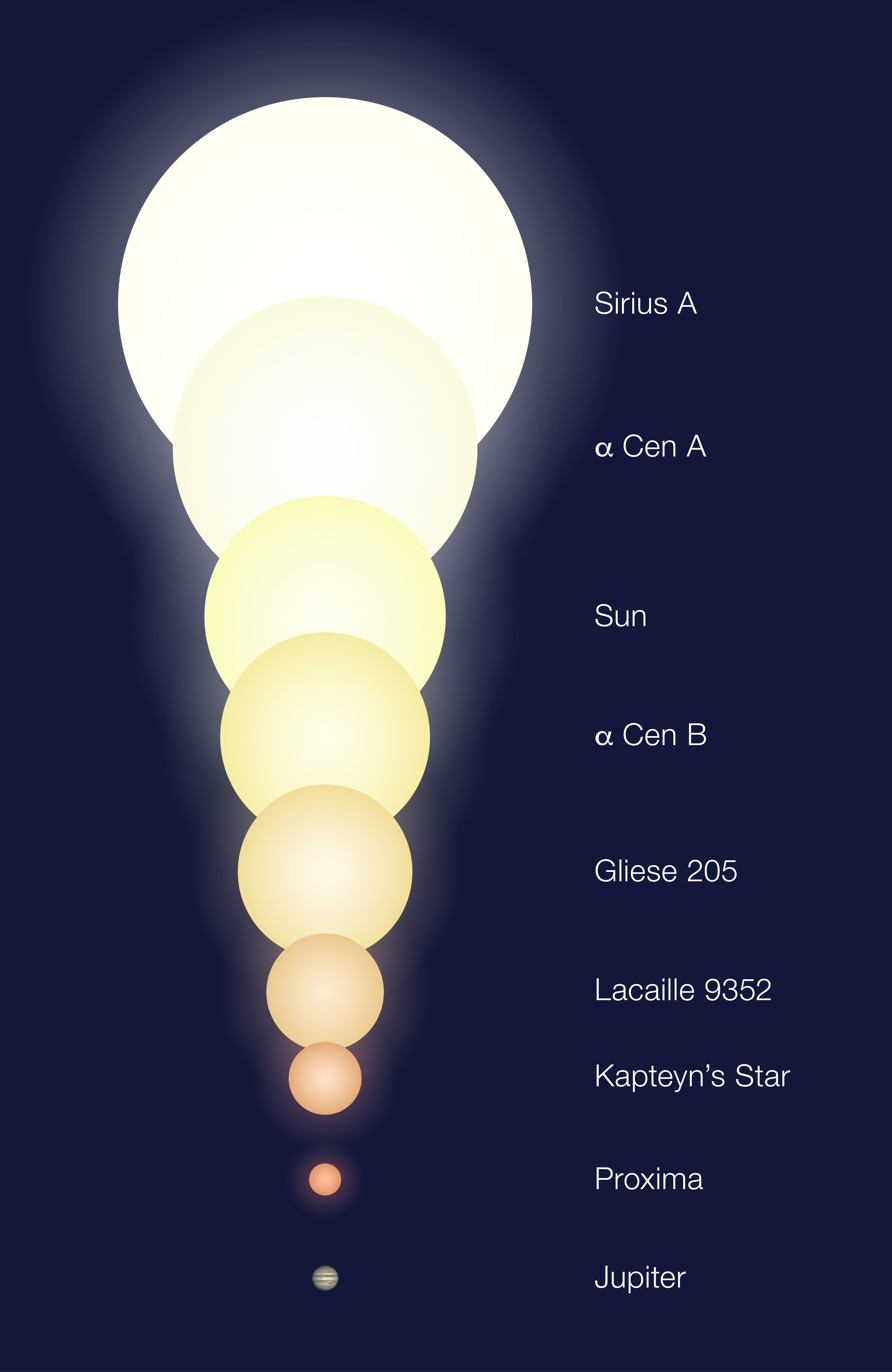
Relative sizes of local stars, incl. Sirius, the Sun and Jupiter (artist's impression)

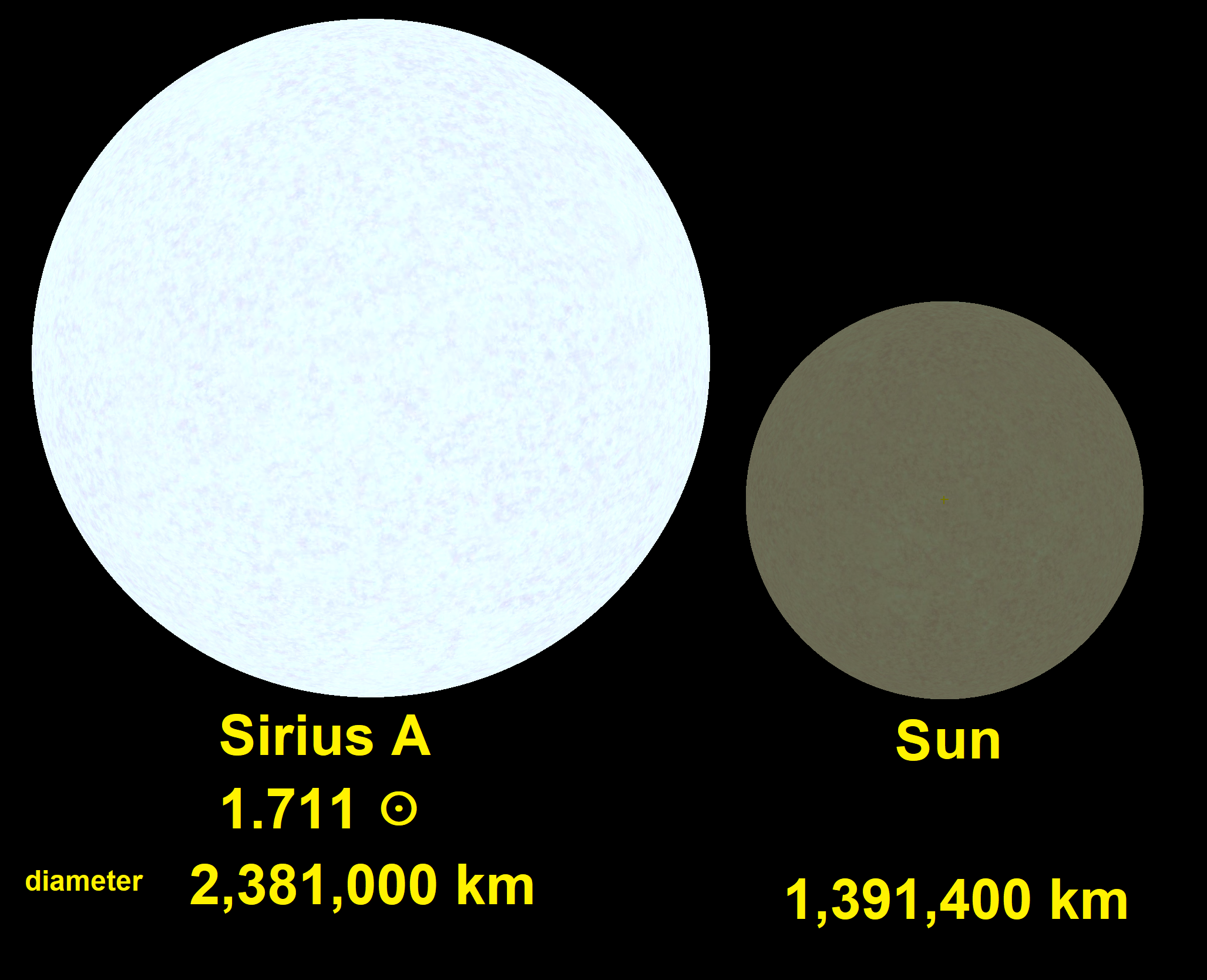
Comparison of Sirius A and the Sun, to scale and relative surface brightness

Sirius A, also known as the Dog Star, has a mass of 2.063 M_{☉}. The radius of this star has been measured by an astronomical interferometer, giving an estimated angular diameter of 5.936±0.016 mas. The projected rotational velocity is a relatively low 16 km/s, which does not produce any significant flattening of its disk. This is at marked variance with the similar-sized Vega, which rotates at a much faster 274 km/s and bulges prominently around its equator. A weak magnetic field has been detected on the surface of Sirius A.

Stellar models suggest that the star formed during the collapsing of a molecular cloud and that, after 10 million years, its internal energy generation was derived entirely from nuclear reactions. The core became convective and used the CNO cycle for energy generation. It is calculated that Sirius A will have completely exhausted the store of hydrogen at its core within a billion (10^{9}) years of its formation, and will then evolve away from the main sequence. It will pass through a red giant stage and eventually become a white dwarf.

Sirius A is classed as a type Am star, because the spectrum shows deep metallic absorption lines, indicating an enhancement of its surface layers in elements heavier than helium, such as iron. The spectral type has been reported as A0mA1 Va, which indicates that it would be classified as A1 from hydrogen and helium lines, but A0 from the metallic lines that cause it to be grouped with the Am stars. When compared to the Sun, the proportion of iron in the atmosphere of Sirius A relative to hydrogen is given by $\textstyle\ \left[\frac{\ce{Fe}}{\ce{H}}\right] = 0.5\ ,$ meaning iron is 316% as abundant as in the Sun's atmosphere. The high surface content of metallic elements is unlikely to be true of the entire star; rather the iron-peak and heavy metals are radiatively levitated towards the surface.

=== Sirius B ===
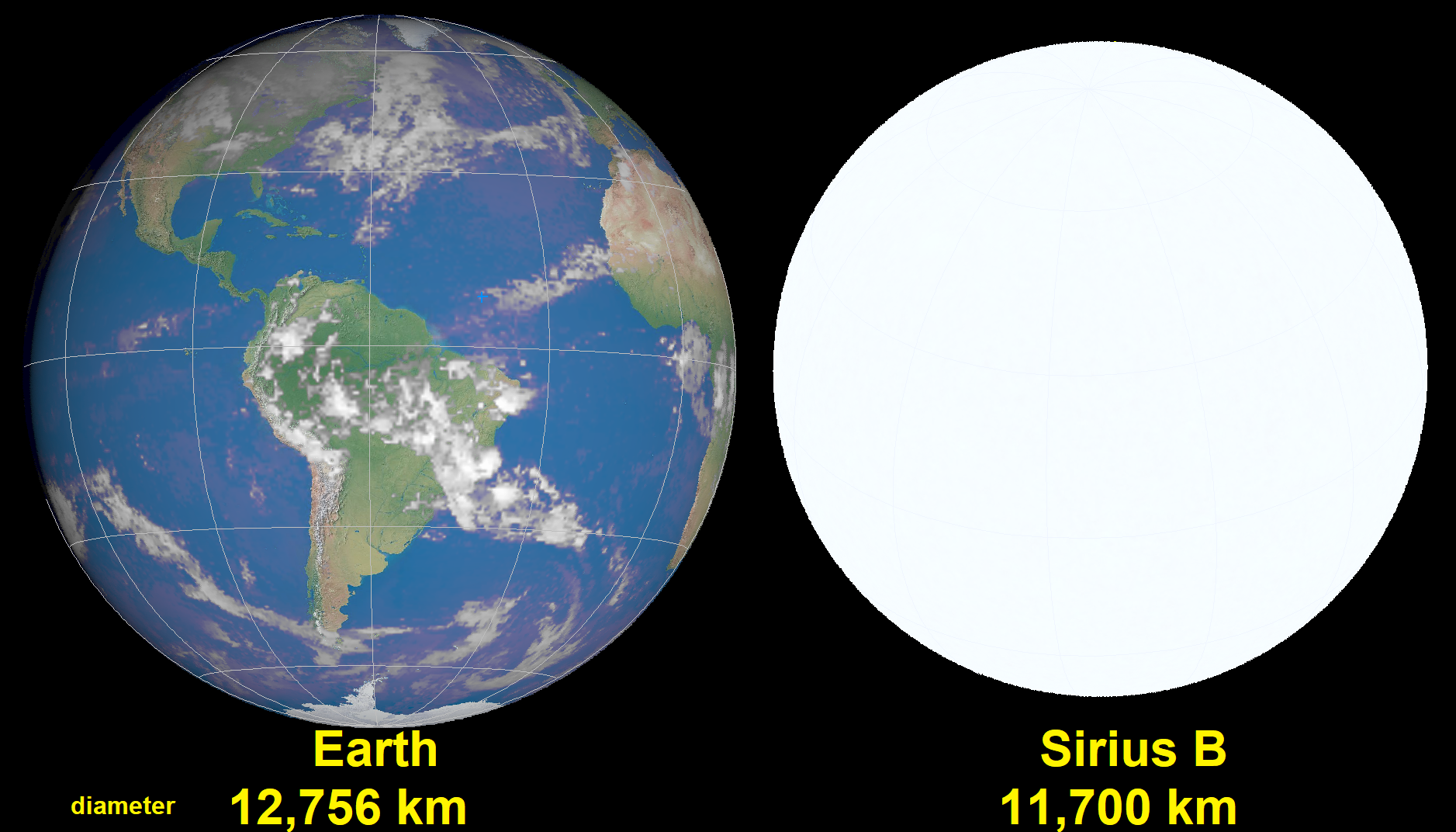
Size comparison of Sirius B and Earth

Sirius B (sometimes called "the Pup") is one of the most massive white dwarfs known. With a mass of 1.02 M_{☉}, it is almost double the 0.5–0.6 M_{☉} average. This mass is packed into a volume roughly equal to the Earth's. The current surface temperature is 25,200 K. Because there is no internal heat source, Sirius B will steadily cool as the remaining heat is radiated into space over the next two billion years or so.

A white dwarf forms after a star has evolved from the main sequence and then passed through a red giant stage. This occurred when Sirius B was less than half its current age, around 120 million years ago. The original star had an estimated 5 M_{☉} and was a B-type star (most likely B5V for 5 M_{☉}) when it was still on the main sequence, potentially burning around 600–1200 times more luminous than the Sun. While it passed through the red giant stage, Sirius B may have enriched the metallicity of its companion, explaining the very high metallicity of Sirius A.

This star is primarily composed of a carbon–oxygen mixture that was generated by helium fusion in the progenitor star. This is overlaid by an envelope of lighter elements, with the materials segregated by mass because of the high surface gravity. The outer atmosphere of Sirius B is now almost pure hydrogen—the element with the lowest mass—and no other elements are seen in its spectrum.

=== Apparent third star ===
Since 1894, irregularities have been tentatively observed in the orbits of Sirius A and B with an apparent periodicity of 6–6.4 years. A 1995 study concluded that such a companion likely exists, with a mass of roughly 0.05 solar mass—a small red dwarf or large brown dwarf, with an apparent magnitude of more than 15, and less than 3 arcseconds from Sirius A.

In 2017, more accurate astrometric observations by the Hubble Space Telescope ruled out the existence of a stellar mass sized Sirius C, while still allowing a substellar mass candidate such as a lower mass brown dwarf. The 1995 study predicted an astrometric movement of roughly 90 mas (0.09 arcsecond), but Hubble was unable to detect any location anomaly to an accuracy of 5 mas (0.005 arcsec). This ruled out any objects orbiting Sirius A with more than 0.033 solar mass (35 Jupiter masses) in 0.5 years, and 0.014 (15 Jupiter masses) in 2 years. The study was also able to rule out any companions to Sirius B with more than 0.024 solar mass (25 Jupiter masses) orbiting in 0.5 year, and 0.0095 (10 Jupiter masses) orbiting in 1.8 years. Effectively, there are almost certainly no additional bodies in the Sirius system larger than a small brown dwarf or large exoplanet.

=== Star cluster membership ===
In 1909, Ejnar Hertzsprung was the first to suggest that Sirius was a member of the Ursa Major Moving Group, based on his observations of the system's movements across the sky. The Ursa Major Group is a set of 220 stars that share a common motion through space. It was once a member of an open cluster, but has since become gravitationally unbound from the cluster. Analyses in 2003 and 2005 found Sirius's membership in the group to be questionable: the Ursa Major Group has an estimated age of 500 ± 100 million years, whereas Sirius, with metallicity similar to the Sun's, has an age that is only half this, making it too young to belong to the group. Sirius may instead be a member of the proposed Sirius Supercluster, along with other scattered stars such as Beta Aurigae, Alpha Coronae Borealis, Beta Crateris, Beta Eridani and Beta Serpentis. This would be one of three large clusters located within 500 light-years (150 pc) of the Sun. The other two are the Hyades and the Pleiades, and each of these clusters consists of hundreds of stars.

=== Distant star cluster ===
In 2017, a massive star cluster was discovered only 10 arcminutes from Sirius, making the two appear to be visually close to one other when viewed from the point of view of the Earth. It was discovered during a statistical analysis of Gaia data. The cluster is over a thousand times farther away from Earth than the star system, but given its size it still appears at magnitude 8.3.

== Cultural significance ==
=== Dog Star ===
Many cultures have historically attached special significance to Sirius, particularly in relation to dogs. It is often colloquially called the "Dog Star" as the brightest star of Canis Major, the "Great Dog" constellation. Canis Major was classically depicted as Orion's dog. The Ancient Greeks thought that Sirius's emanations could affect dogs adversely, making them behave abnormally during the "dog days", the hottest days of the summer. The Romans knew these days as dies caniculares, and the star Sirius was called Canicula, "little dog". The excessive panting of dogs in hot weather was thought to place them at risk of desiccation and disease. In extreme cases, a foaming dog might have rabies, which could infect and kill humans they had bitten. Homer, in the Iliad, describes the approach of Achilles toward Troy in these words:

Sirius rises late in the dark, liquid sky
On summer nights, star of stars,
Orion's Dog they call it, brightest
Of all, but an evil portent, bringing heat
And fevers to suffering humanity.

==== Other canine associations ====
In Chinese astronomy Sirius is known as the star of the "celestial wolf" (Chinese and Japanese: 天狼 Chinese romanization: Tiānláng; Japanese romanization: Tenrō; Korean and romanization: 천랑 /Cheonrang) in the Mansion of Jǐng (井宿). Many nations among the indigenous peoples of North America also associated Sirius with canines; the Seri and Tohono Oʼodham of the southwest note the star as a dog that follows mountain sheep, while the Blackfoot called it "Dog-face". The Cherokee paired Sirius with Antares as a dog-star guardian of either end of the "Path of Souls". The Pawnee of Nebraska had several associations; the Wolf (Skidi) tribe knew it as the "Wolf Star", while other branches knew it as the "Coyote Star". Further north, the Alaskan Inuit of the Bering Strait called it "Moon Dog".

=== Range of associations ===
In a little-attested Greek myth, the star-god that personified Sirius fell in love with a fertility goddess named Opora, but he was unable to have her. Thus he began to burn hot, making humans suffer, who prayed to the gods. The god of the north wind, Boreas, solved the problem by ordering his sons to deliver Opora to Sirius, while he cooled down the earth with blasts of his own cold wind.

=== Iranian mythology and Zoroastrianism ===
In Iranian mythology, especially in Persian mythology and in Zoroastrianism, the ancient religion of Persia, Sirius appears as Tishtrya and is revered as the rain-maker divinity (Tishtar of New Persian poetry). Beside passages in one of the hymns of the Avesta, the Avestan language Tishtrya followed by the version Tir in Middle and New Persian is also depicted in the Persian epic Shahnameh of Ferdowsi. Because of the concept of the yazatas, powers which are "worthy of worship", Tishtrya is a divinity of rain and fertility and an antagonist of apaosha, the demon of drought. In this struggle, Tishtrya is depicted as a white horse.

Several cultures also associated the star with a bow and arrows. The ancient Chinese visualized a large bow and arrow across the southern sky, formed by the constellations of Puppis and Canis Major. In this, the arrow tip is pointed at the wolf Sirius. A similar association is depicted at the Temple of Hathor in Dendera, where the goddess Satet has drawn her arrow at Hathor (Sirius). Known as "Tir", the star was portrayed as the arrow itself in later Persian culture.

=== In Islam ===
Sirius is mentioned in Surah An-Najm ("The Star") of the Qur'an, where it is referred to as (Arabic: الشِّعْرَىٰ, romanized: ash-shi‘rā), meaning "the Bright Star" or "Leader"). The verse is:

وَأَنَّهُۥ هُوَ رَبُّ ٱلشِّعْرَىٰ
And He alone is the Lord of Sirius.

— Surah An-Najm 53:49

In Islamic belief, celestial bodies mentioned in the Qur’an often symbolize divine power and serve as signs (āyāt) of God's creation. Ibn Kathir, in his commentary on the verse, noted that it refers to the bright star known as Mirzam al-Jawza' (Sirius), which some pre-Islamic Arab tribes used to worship.

The alternative Western name Aschere, once used by Johann Bayer, is derived from this Arabic reference.

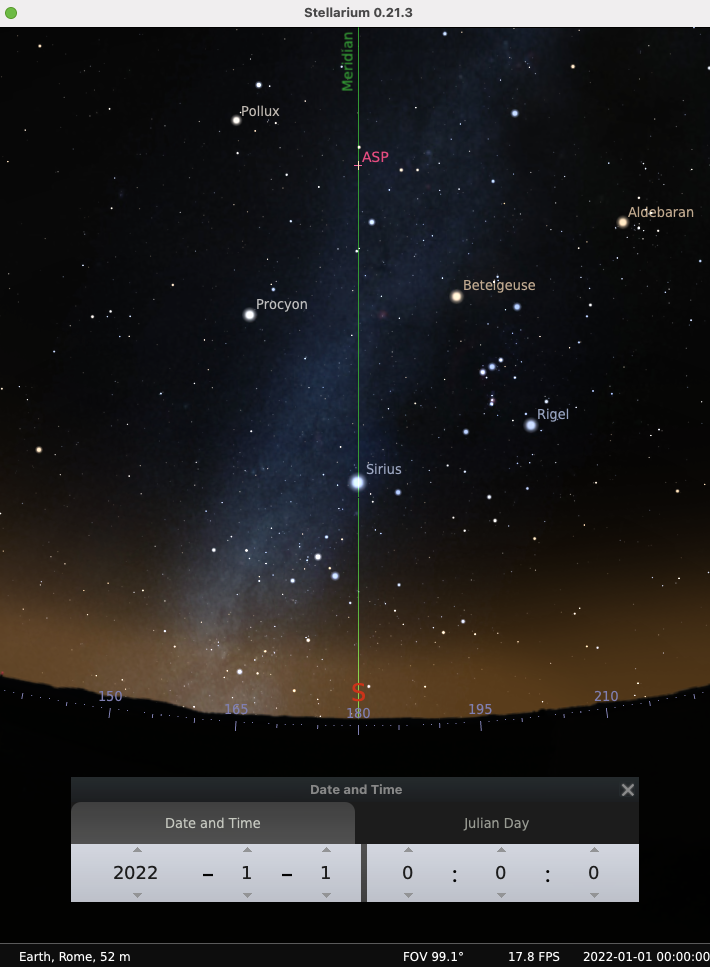
Sirius midnight culmination at New Year 2022 local solar time

=== In Theosophy ===
In theosophy, it is believed the Seven Stars of the Pleiades transmit the spiritual energy of the Seven Rays from the Galactic Logos to the Seven Stars of the Great Bear, then to Sirius. From there is it sent via the Sun to the god of Earth (Sanat Kumara), and finally through the seven Masters of the Seven Rays to the human race.

=== New Year culmination ===
The midnight culmination of Sirius in the northern hemisphere coincides with the beginning of the New Year of the Gregorian calendar during the decades around the year 2000. Over the years, its midnight culmination moves slowly, owing to the combination of the star's proper motion and the precession of the equinoxes. At the time of the introduction of the Gregorian calendar in the year 1582, its culmination occurred 17 minutes before midnight into the new year under the assumption of a constant motion. According to Richard Hinckley Allen its midnight culmination was celebrated at the Temple of Demeter at Eleusis.

=== Dogon ===
The Dogon people are an ethnic group in Mali, West Africa, reported by some researchers to have traditional astronomical knowledge about Sirius that would normally be considered impossible without the use of telescopes. According to Marcel Griaule, they knew about the fifty-year orbital period of Sirius and its companion prior to western astronomers.

Doubts have been raised about the validity of Griaule and Dieterlein's work. In 1991, anthropologist Walter van Beek concluded about the Dogon, "Though they do speak about sigu tolo [which is what Griaule claimed the Dogon called Sirius] they disagree completely with each other as to which star is meant; for some it is an invisible star that should rise to announce the sigu [festival], for another it is Venus that, through a different position, appears as sigu tolo. All agree, however, that they learned about the star from Griaule." According to Noah Brosch cultural transfer of relatively modern astronomical information could have taken place in 1893, when a French expedition arrived in Central West Africa to observe the total eclipse on 16 April.

=== Serer religion ===
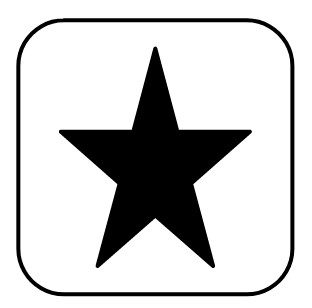
Yoonir (Sirius), symbol of the universe in Serer religion

In the religion of the Serer people of Senegal, the Gambia and Mauritania, Sirius is called Yoonir from the Serer language (and some of the Cangin language speakers, who are all ethnically Serers). The star Sirius is one of the most important and sacred stars in Serer religious cosmology and symbolism. The Serer high priests and priestesses (Saltigues, the hereditary "rain priests") chart Yoonir to forecast rainfall and enable Serer farmers to start planting seeds. In Serer religious cosmology, it is the symbol of the universe.

=== Modern significance ===
Sirius features on the coat of arms of Macquarie University, and is the name of its alumnae journal. Seven ships of the Royal Navy have been called HMS Sirius since the 18th century, with the first being the flagship of the First Fleet to Australia in 1788. The Royal Australian Navy subsequently named a vessel HMAS Sirius in honor of the flagship. American vessels include the USNS Sirius (T-AFS-8) as well as a monoplane model—the Lockheed Sirius, the first of which was flown by Charles Lindbergh. The name was also adopted by Mitsubishi Motors as the Mitsubishi Sirius engine in 1980. The name of the North American satellite radio company CD Radio was changed to Sirius Satellite Radio in November 1999, being named after "the brightest star in the night sky". Sirius is one of the 27 stars on the flag of Brazil, where it represents the state of Mato Grosso.

Composer Karlheinz Stockhausen, who wrote a piece called Sirius, is claimed to have said on several occasions that he came from a planet in the Sirius system. To Stockhausen, Sirius stood for "the place where music is the highest of vibrations" and where music had been developed in the most perfect way.

Sirius has been the subject of poetry. Dante and John Milton reference the star, and it is the "powerful western fallen star" of Walt Whitman's "When Lilacs Last in the Dooryard Bloom'd", while Tennyson's poem The Princess describes the star's scintillation:

...the fiery Sirius alters hue
And bickers into red and emerald.

Sirius is also the name of the titular character of Olaf Stapledon's 1944 novel Sirius which examines what it would be like to be the only intelligent dog in the world. Stars in Orion are used on the original cover to form the body of a dog with his nose sniffing Alpha Canis Majoris.

Throughout the 1990s, several members of the occult group the Order of the Solar Temple committed mass murder-suicide with the goal of leaving their bodies and spiritually "transiting" to Sirius. In total, 74 people died in all of the suicides and murders.

== See also ==
- List of stars in Canis Major
- List of brightest stars
- List of nearest stars
  - Historical brightest stars
