= Sopdu =

Ancient Egyptian god of the sky

- Sopdu as depicted in the mortuary temple of Fifth Dynasty pharaoh Sahure
Name in hieroglyphs
M44 G43
- Major cult center: Saft el-Hinna

Genealogy
- Parents: Sah (father); Sopdet (mother)
- Spouse: Khensit

Sopdu (also rendered Septu or Sopedu) was a god of the sky and of eastern border regions in the religion of Ancient Egypt. He was Khensit's husband.

As a sky god, Sopdu was connected with the god Sah, the personification of the constellation Orion, and the goddess Sopdet, representing the star Sirius. According to the Pyramid Texts, Horus-Sopdu, a combination of Sopdu and the greater sky god Horus, is the offspring of Osiris-Sah and Isis-Sopdet.

As a god of the east, Sopdu was said to protect Egyptian outposts along the frontiers and to help the pharaoh control those regions' foreign inhabitants. He was referred to as Lord of the East, and had his greatest cult centre at the easternmost nome of Lower Egypt, which was named Per-Sopdu, meaning place of Sopdu. He also had shrines at Egyptian settlements in the Sinai Peninsula, such as the turquoise mines at Serabit el-Khadim.

== Name ==
Sopdu's name is composed of the hieroglyph for sharp, a pointed triangle, and the 3rd person plural suffix (a quail); thus a literal translation of his name is sharp ones. He was said, in the Pyramid Texts, to protect the teeth of the deceased pharaoh.

Sopdu was depicted as a falcon sitting on a religious standard, often with a two-feathered crown on his head and a flail over his shoulder. In his border-guarding role he was shown as a Near Eastern warrior, with a shemset girdle and an axe or spear.

== Gallery ==
drawing of Sopdu as a reclining falcon with a flail and feathered headdress

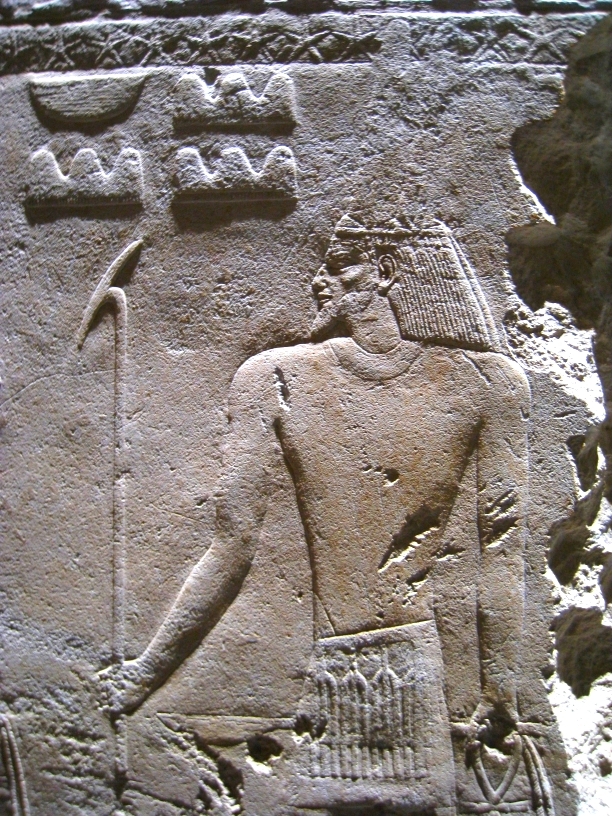
A relief of Sopdu from the mortuary temple of Sahure at Abusir.

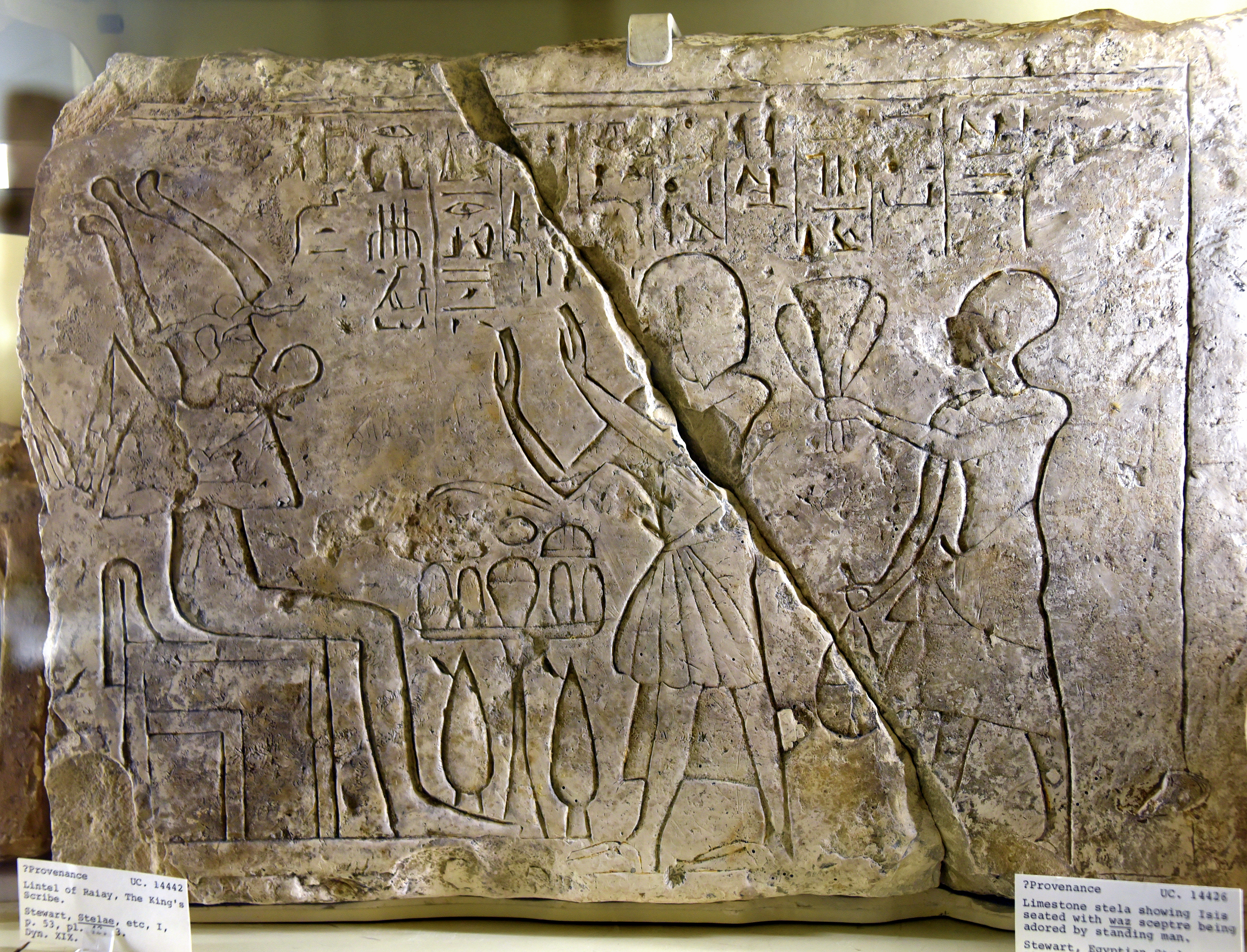
Lintel of Raiay, the King's scribe, and the first god's servant of Sopdu Nakht. Both stand before Osiris. 19th Dynasty. From Egypt. The Petrie Museum of Egyptian Archaeology, London

== See also ==
- Shu
