= Sah (god) =

Ancient Egyptian deity

- Sah was "The father of the gods", which was a personification of the modern Orion and Lepus constellations.
Name in hieroglyphs
D61 N14 G1 A40
- Symbol: Orion, Lepus (constellations), star boat
- Consort: Sopdet (star Sirius)
- Offspring: Sopdu

Sah (sꜣḥ) was a god in Ancient Egyptian religion, representing a constellation that encompassed the stars in Orion and Lepus, as well as stars found in some neighbouring modern constellations.

His consort was Sopdet known by the ancient Greek name as Sothis, the goddess of the star Sirius. Sah came to be associated with a more important deity, Osiris, and Sopdet with Osiris's consort Isis.

Sah was frequently mentioned as "the Father of Gods" in the Old Kingdom Pyramid Texts. The pharaoh was thought to travel to Orion after his death.
