= History of sundials =

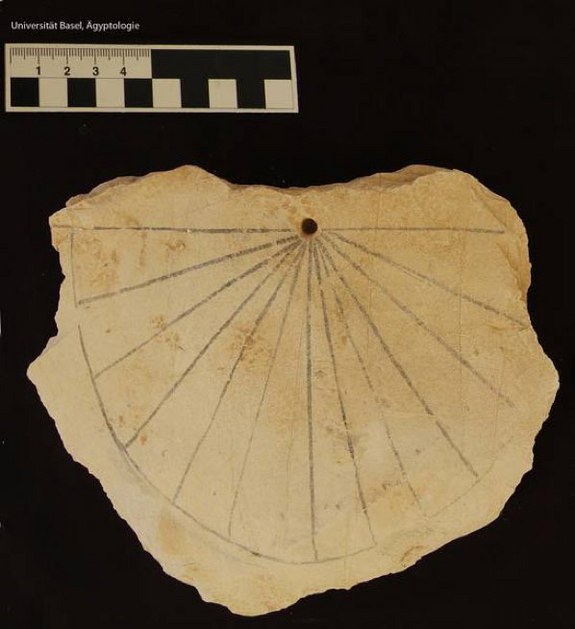
World's oldest known sundial, from Egypt's Valley of the Kings (c. 1500 BC), used to measure work hours.

A sundial is a device that indicates time by using a light spot or shadow cast by the position of the Sun on a reference scale. As the Earth turns on its polar axis, the sun appears to cross the sky from east to west, rising at sun-rise from beneath the horizon to a zenith at mid-day and falling again behind the horizon at sunset. Both the azimuth (direction) and the altitude (height) can be used to create time measuring devices. Sundials have been invented independently in every major culture and became more accurate and sophisticated as the culture developed.

== Introduction ==
A sundial uses local time. Before the coming of the railways in the 1840s, local time was displayed on a sundial and was used by the government and commerce. Before the invention of the clock the sundial was the only way to measure time. After the invention of the clock, the sundial maintained its importance, as clocks needed to be reset regularly from a sundial, because the accuracy of early clocks was poor. A clock and a sundial were used together to measure longitude. Dials were laid out using straightedges and compasses. In the late nineteenth century sundials became objects of academic interest. The use of logarithms allowed algebraic methods of laying out dials to be employed and studied. No longer utilitarian, sundials remained as popular ornaments, and several popular books promoted that interest and gave constructional details. Affordable scientific calculators made the algebraic methods as accessible as the geometric constructions and the use of computers made dial plate design trivial. The heritage of sundials was recognised and sundial societies were set up worldwide, and certain legislations made studying sundials part of their national school curriculums.

== History ==
=== Ancient sundials ===
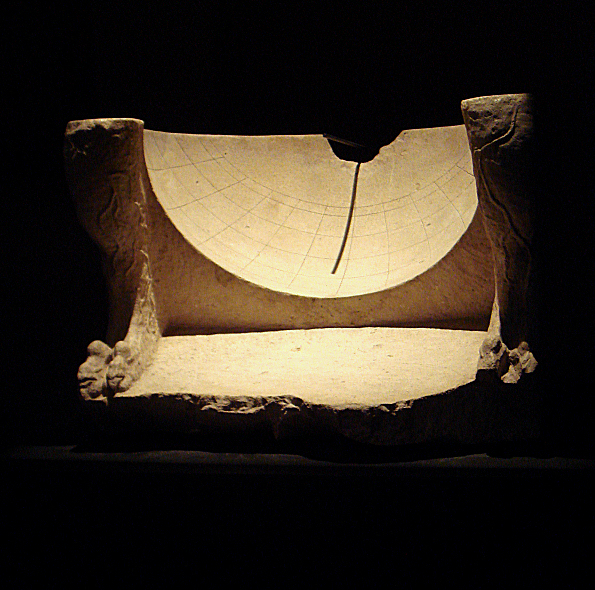
Hemispherical Greek sundial from Ai Khanoum, Afghanistan (3rd–2nd century BCE).

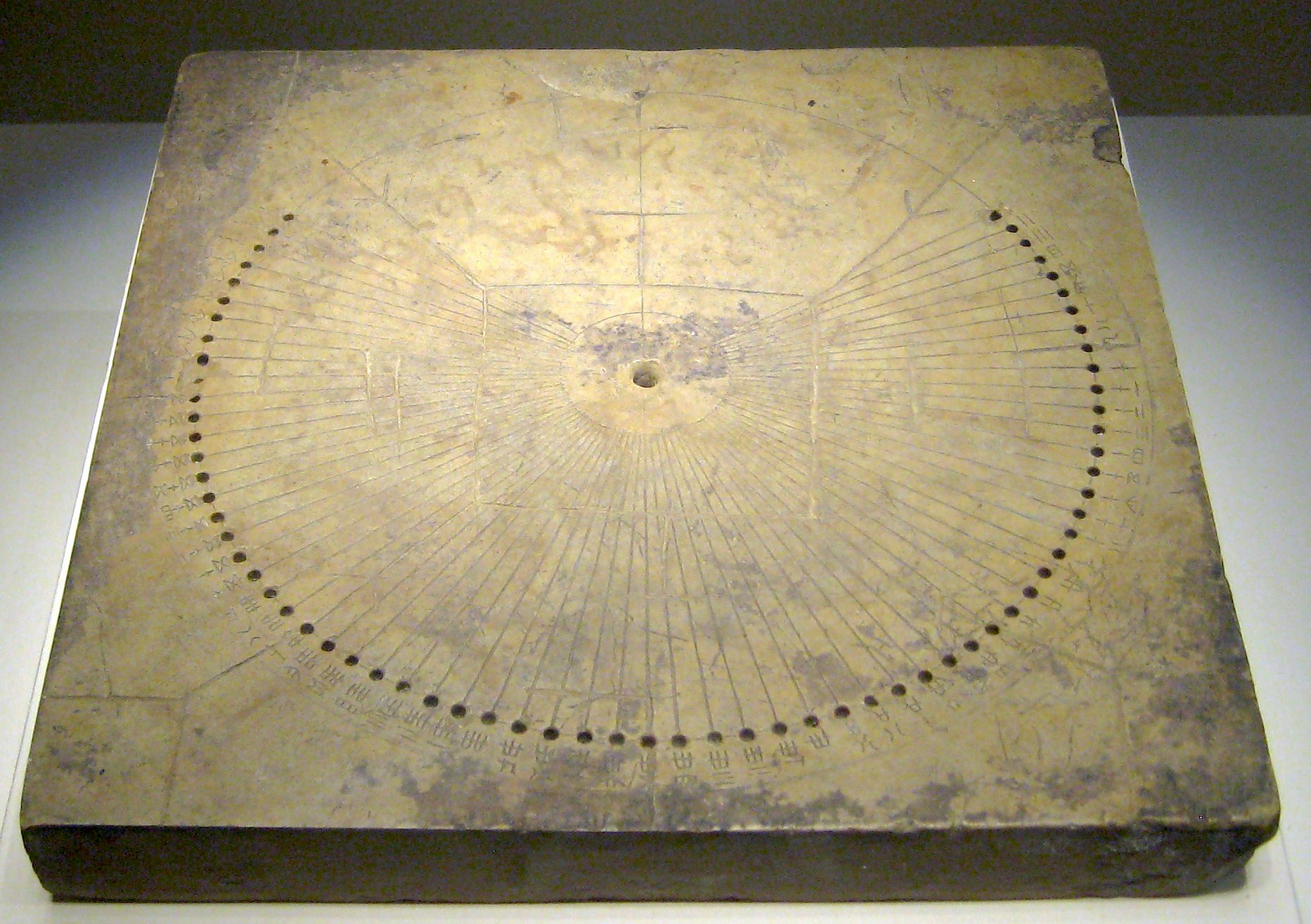
Chinese sundial of the Eastern Han dynasty (2nd century CE).

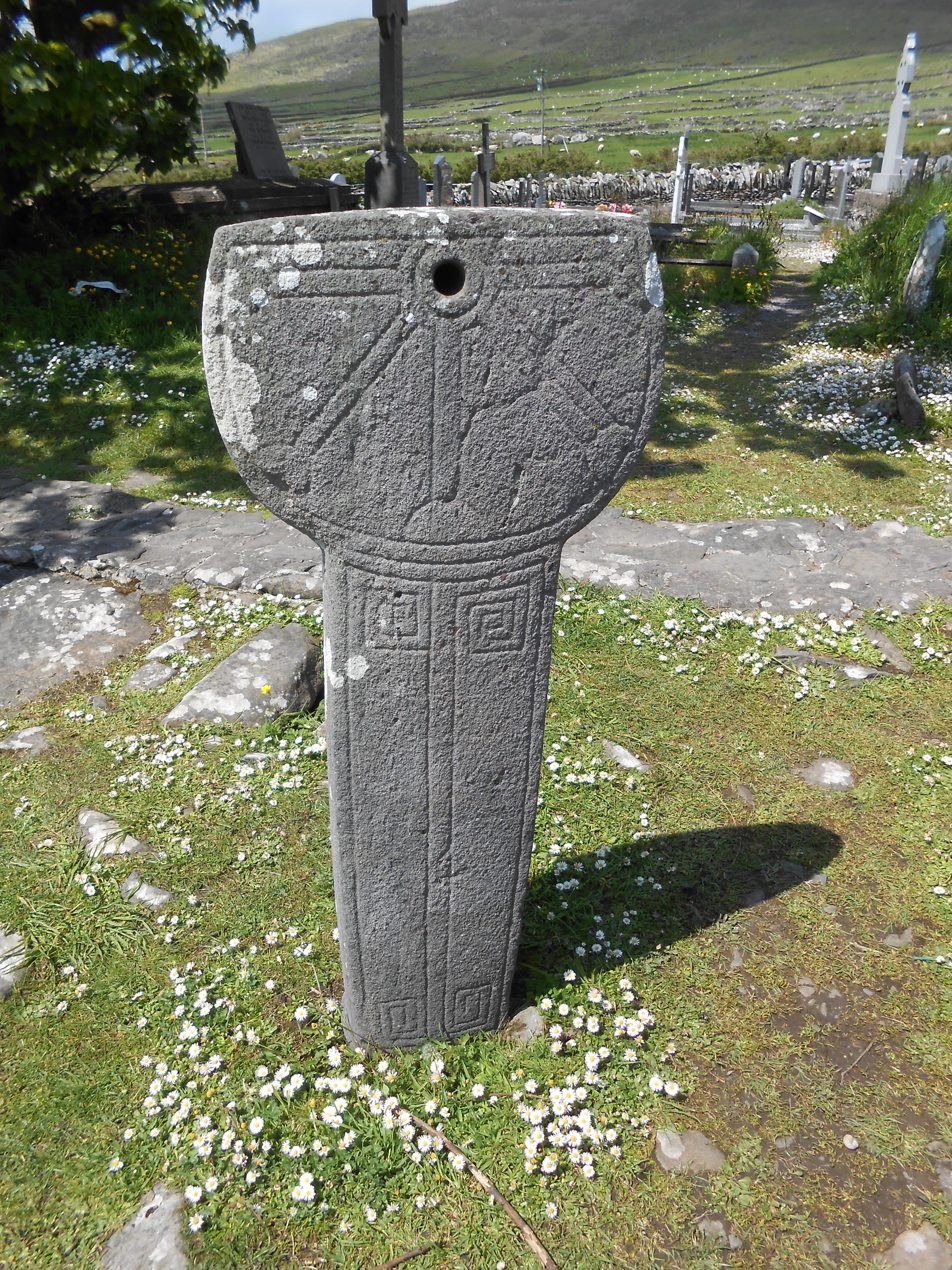
Sundial stone, Kilmalkedar, Ireland (c. 7th century CE).

The earliest household clocks known, from the archaeological finds, are the sundials (1500 BCE) in Ancient Egypt and ancient Babylonian astronomy. Ancient analemmatic sundials of the same era (about 1500 BCE) and their prototype have been discovered on the territory of modern Russia. Much earlier obelisks, once thought to have been used also as sundials, placed at temples built in honor of a pharaoh, are now thought to serve only as a memorial. Presumably, humans were telling time from shadow-lengths at an even earlier date, but this is hard to verify. Sundials were also developed in Kush. Sundials existed in China since ancient times, but very little is known of their history. It is known that the ancient Chinese developed a form of sundials c. 800 BCE, and the sundials eventually evolved to very sophisticated water clocks by 1000 CE, and sometime in the Song dynasty (1000–1400 CE), a compass would sometimes also be constructed on the sundial.

An early reference to sundials from 104 BCE is in an assembly of calendar experts.

The ancient Greeks developed many of the principles and forms of the sundial. Sundials are believed to have been introduced into Greece by Anaximander of Miletus, c. 560 BCE. According to Herodotus, Greek sundials were initially derived from their Babylonian counterparts. The Greeks were well-positioned to develop the science of sundials, having developed the science of geometry, and in particular discovering the conic sections that are traced by a sundial nodus. The mathematician and astronomer Theodosius of Bithynia (c. 160 BCE to c. 100 BCE) is said to have invented a universal sundial that could be used anywhere on Earth.

The Romans adopted the Greek sundials, and the first record of a sundial in Rome is in 293 BCE according to Pliny. A comic character in a play by Plautus complained about his day being "chopped into pieces" by the ubiquitous sundials. Writing in c. 25 BCE, the Roman author Vitruvius listed all the known types of dials in Book IX of his De Architectura, together with their Greek inventors. All of these are believed to be nodus-type sundials, differing mainly in the surface that receives the shadow of the nodus.

- the hemicyclium of Berosus the Chaldean: a truncated, concave, hemispherical surface
- the hemispherium or scaphe of Aristarchus of Samos: a full, concave, hemispherical surface
- the discus (a disc on a plane surface) of Aristarchus of Samos: a fully circular equatorial dial with nodus
- the arachne (spiderweb) of Eudoxus of Cnidus or Apollonius of Perga: half a circular equatorial dial with nodus
- the plinthium or lacunar of Scopinas of Syracuse: an example in the Circus Flaminius)
- the pros ta historoumena (universal dial) of Parmenio
- the pros pan klima of Theodosius of Bithynia and Andreas
- the pelekinon of Patrocles: the classic double-bladed axe design of hyperbolae on a planar surface
- the cone of Dionysodorus: a concave, conical surface
- the quiver of Apollonius of Perga
- the conarachne
- the conical plinthium
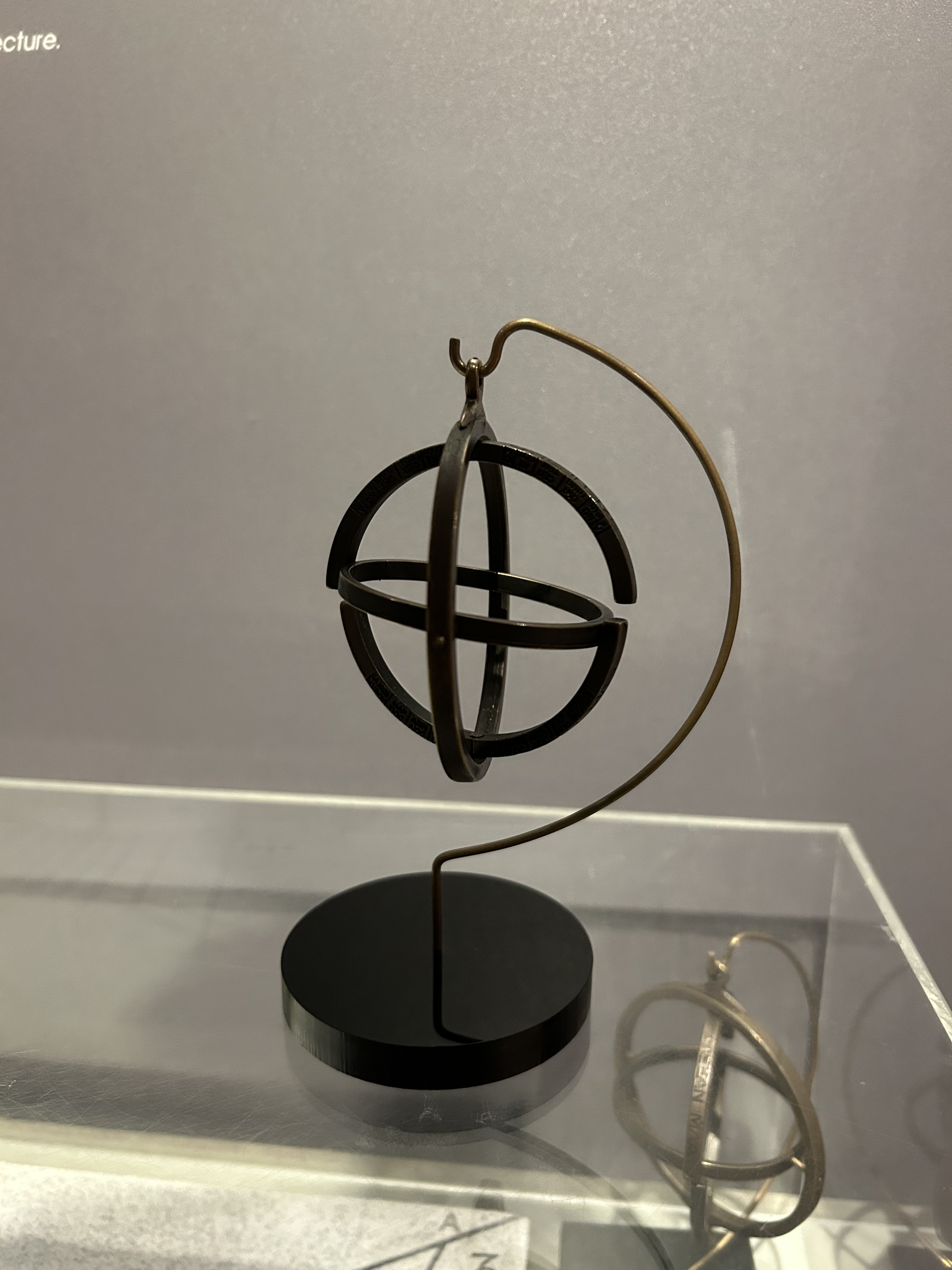
- A replica of Parmenion's portable sundial clock (3rd c. B.C.), in Kotsanas Museum of Ancient Greek Technology, Athens, Greece.
  the antiboreum: a hemispherium that faces North, with the sunlight entering through a small hole.

The Romans built a very large sundial in c. 10 BCE, the Solarium Augusti, which is a classic nodus-based obelisk casting a shadow on a planar pelekinon. The Globe of Matelica is felt to have been part of an Ancient Roman sundial from the 1st or 2nd century.

The custom of measuring time by one's shadow has persisted since ancient times. In Aristophanes' play Assembly of Women, Praxagora asks her husband to return when his shadow reaches 10 feet (3.0 m).

=== Medieval sundials ===
The Greek dials were inherited and developed further by astronomers of the Islamic Caliphates and post-Renaissance Europeans.

The Venerable Bede is reported to have instructed his followers in the art of telling time by interpreting their shadow lengths, however, Bede's most important association with sundials is that he encouraged the use of canonical sundials to fix the times of prayers. The oldest sundial in England is a tide dial incorporated into the Bewcastle Cross, Cumbria, and dates from the 7th or early 8th century.

Since the Greek dials were nodus-based with straight hour-lines, they indicated unequal hours that varied with the seasons, since every day was divided into twelve equal segments; hours were shorter in winter and longer in summer. Sundials with gnomons oriented towards the celestial pole are able to exploit the fact that the markings for the equinoctial hours are a family of straight-line segments, thereby allowing for the measure of equal hours. It is unclear when such sundials were first built. A polar-axis sundial was constructed by the 14th century Arabic engineer Ibn al-Shatir, a replica of which still exists today, though he was not the inventor of the device. The concept may have been known for centuries before his time, and appeared in Western sundials from at least 1446.

Europe then saw an explosion of new designs. Italian astronomer Giovanni Padovani published a treatise on the sundial in 1570, in which he included instructions for the manufacture and laying out of mural (vertical) and horizontal sundials. Giuseppe Biancani's Constructio instrumenti ad horologia solaria (ca. 1620) discusses how to make a perfect sundial, with accompanying illustrations.

The villages around Briançon, Hautes-Alpes, France were a major site of sundial production in the 18th and 19th centuries, with at least 400 painted dials in this one French department. Among the most famous sundial makers of this era was Giovanni Francesco Zarbula, who created a hundred of them between 1833 and 1881.

=== Modern sundials ===
Designers of the Taipei 101, the first record-setting skyscraper of the 21st century, brought the ancient tradition forward. The tower, tallest in the world when it opened in Taiwan in 2004, stands over 500 metres (1,600 ft) in height. The design of an adjoining park uses the tower as the style for a huge horizontal sundial.

== Gallery ==
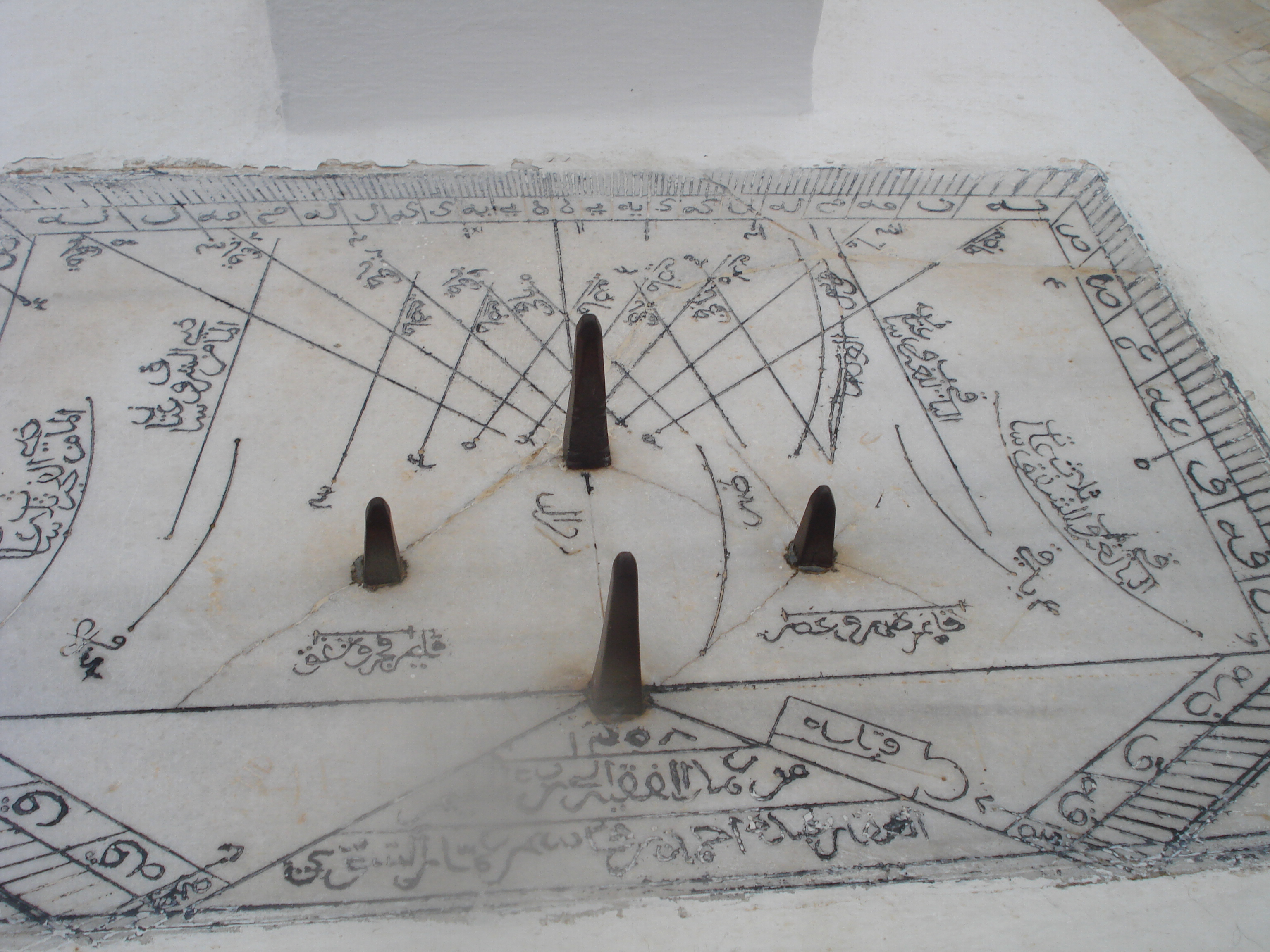
Old sundial located in the Great Mosque of Kairouan also known as the Mosque of Uqba, in Kairouan, Tunisia.

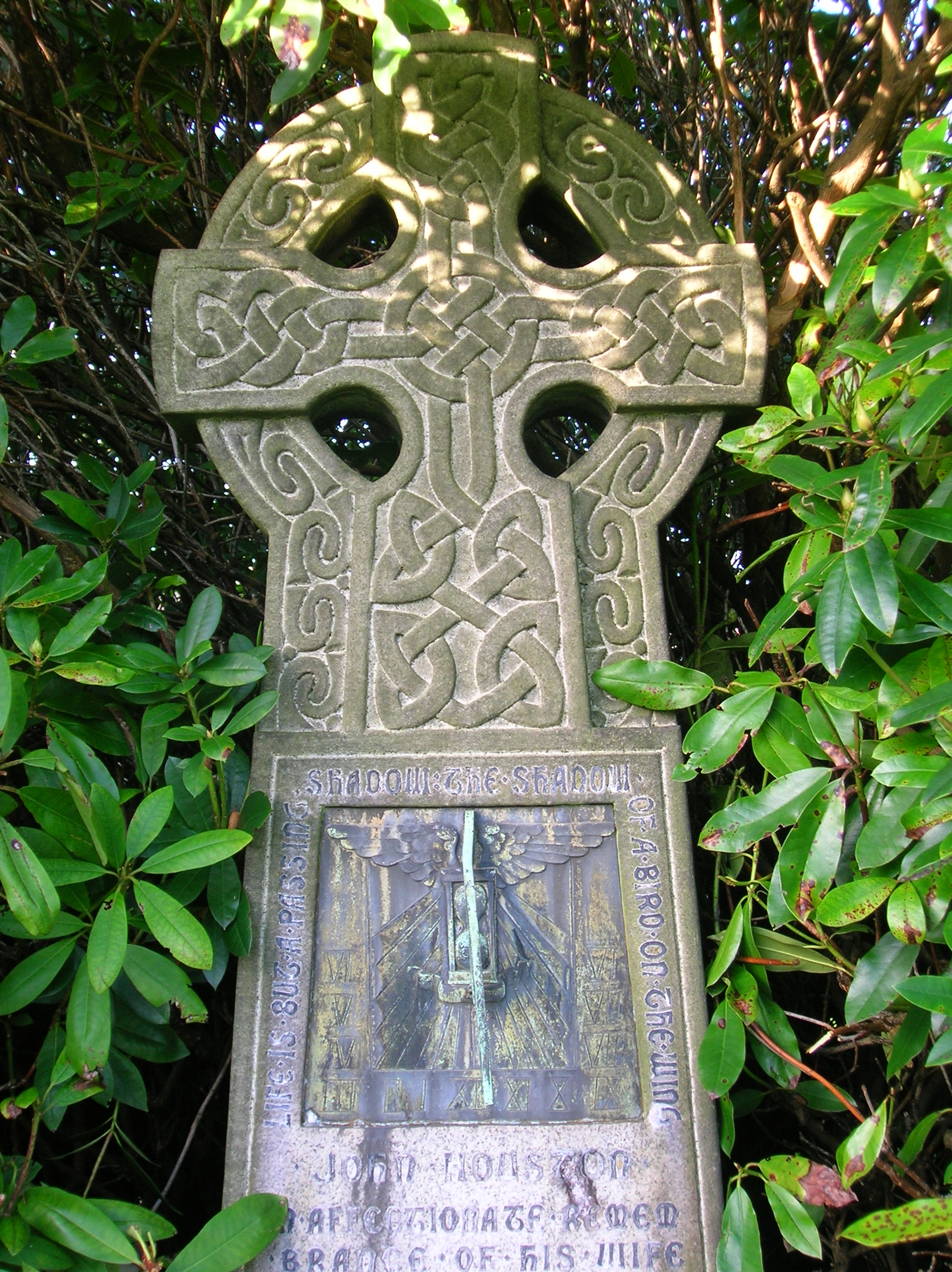
A Scottish gravestone bearing a sundial. The instrument has often doubled as a memento mori.

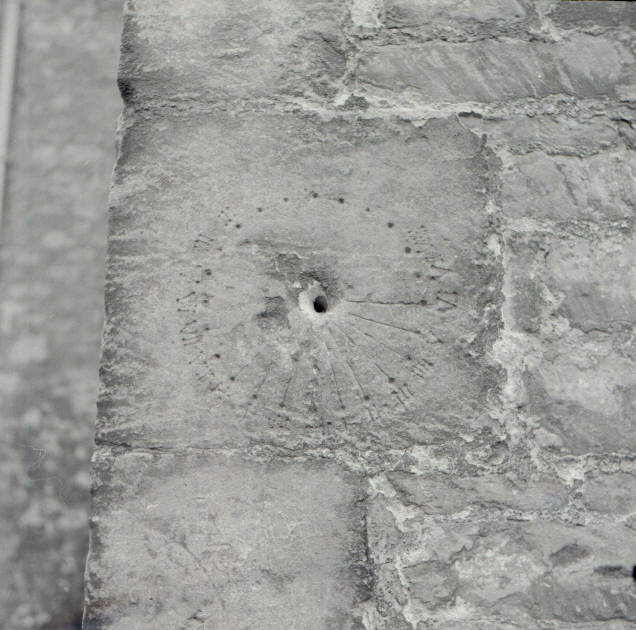
A medieval mass dial (minus its gnomon) at St. Mary, Bibury; also known as a scratch dial, it was used to tell the times of Mass.

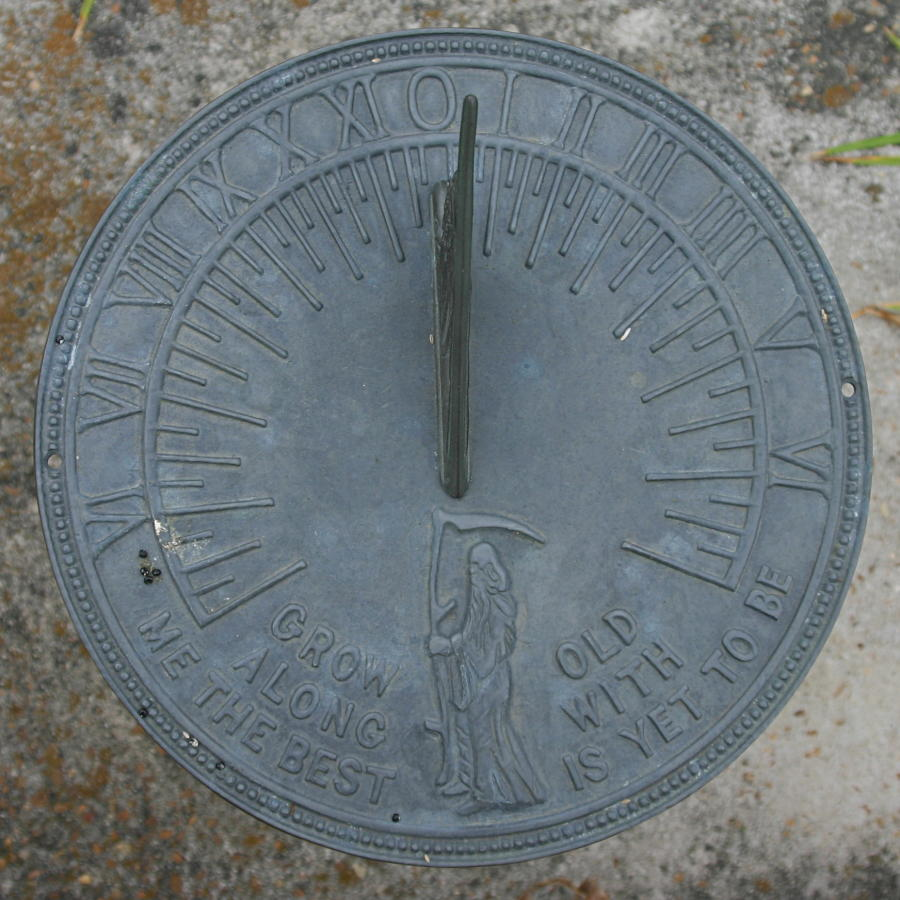
This sundial displays a likeness of Father Time. Its motto quotes Robert Browning: "Grow old along with me; the best is yet to be."

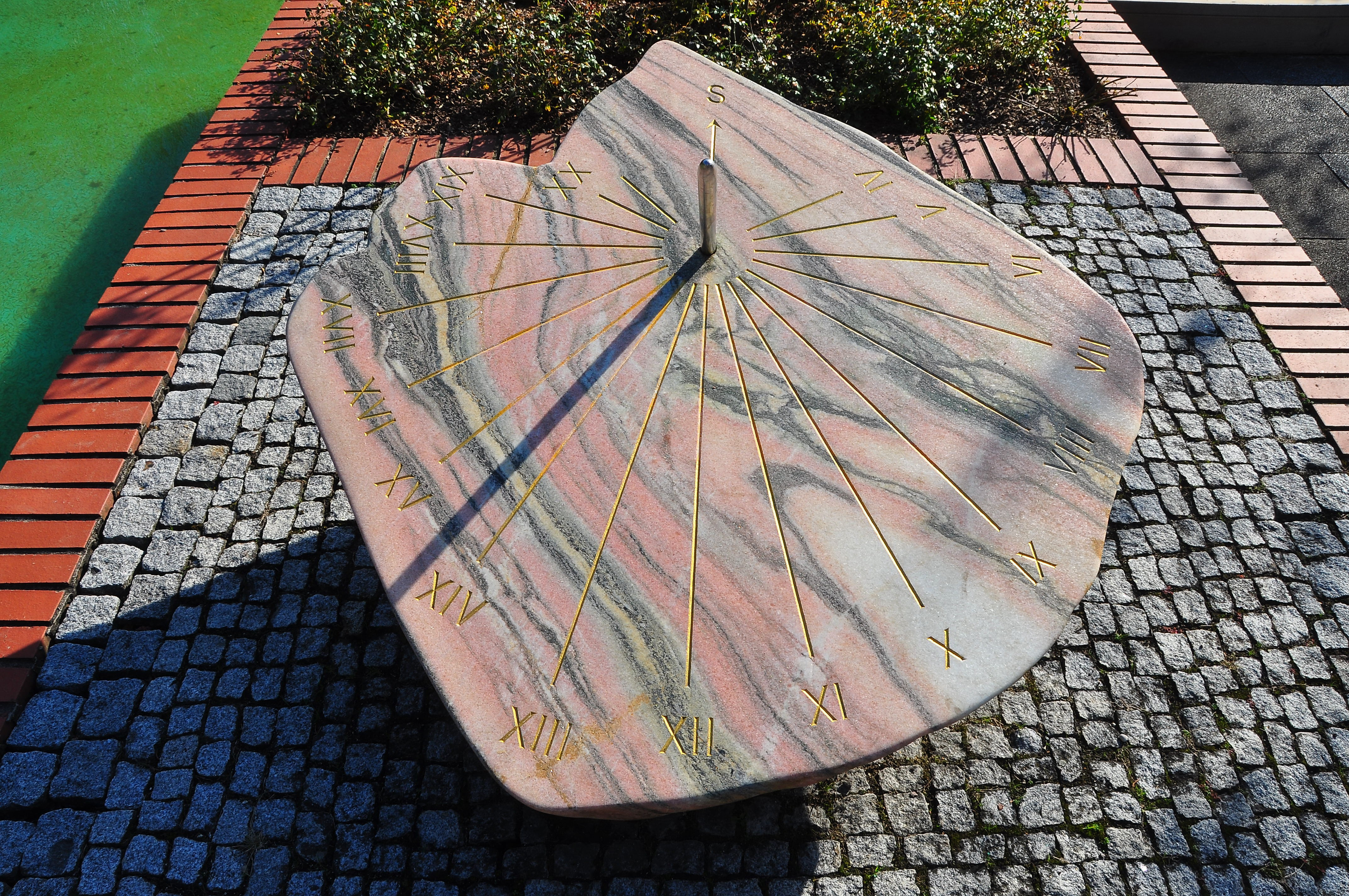
Marble equatorial sundial in the Europapark of Klagenfurt on Lake Woerth, Carinthia, Austria

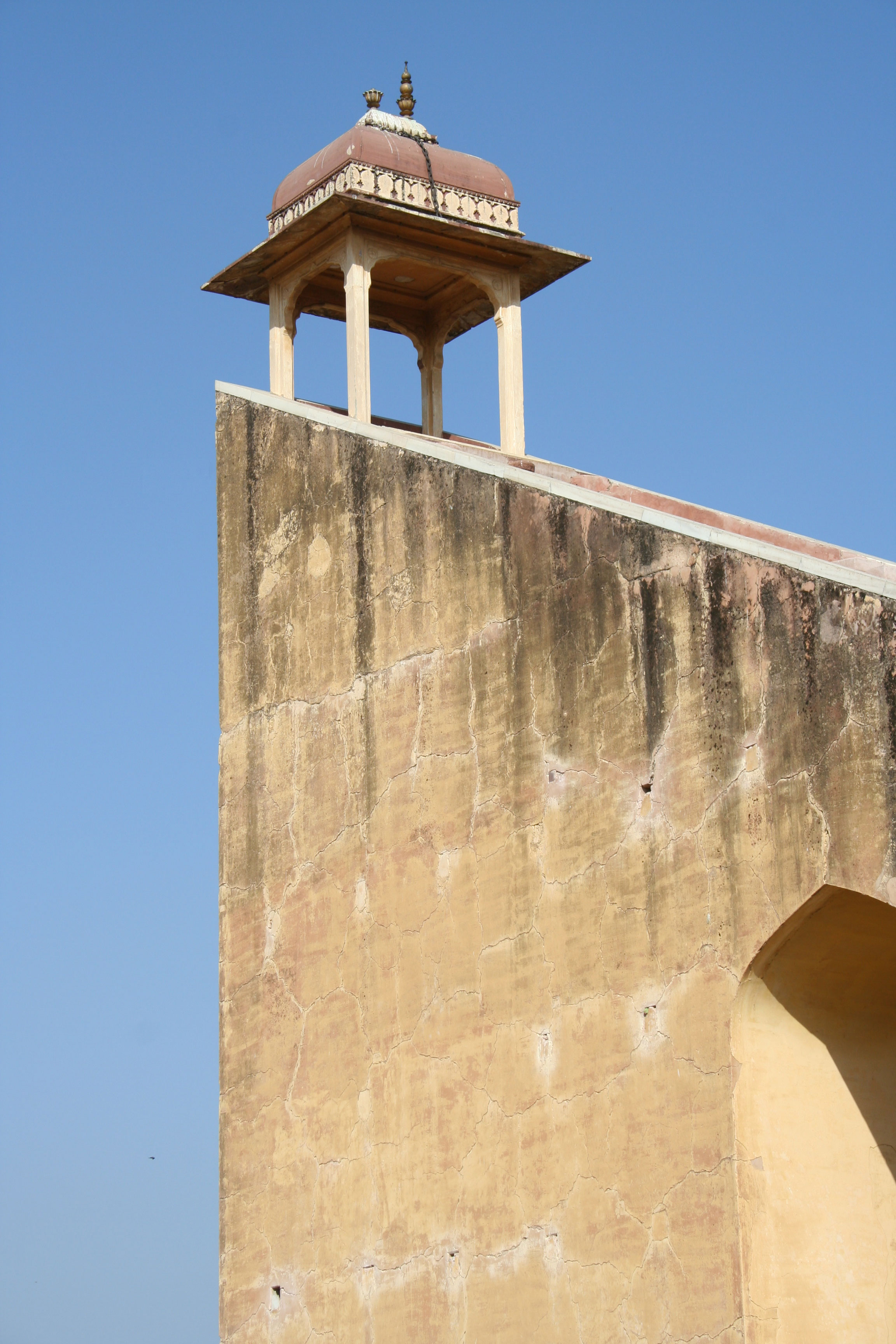
The Giant Sundial of Jantar Mantar in Jaipur, India, stands 27m tall. Its shadow moves visibly at 1 mm per second. 26°55′29″N 75°49′29″E

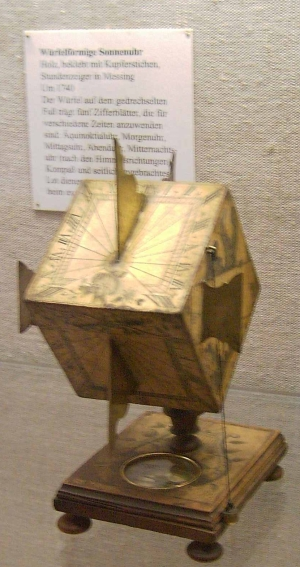
Several sundials arrayed on the faces of a cube. The styles are all parallel and meant to be aligned with the Earth's rotation axis.

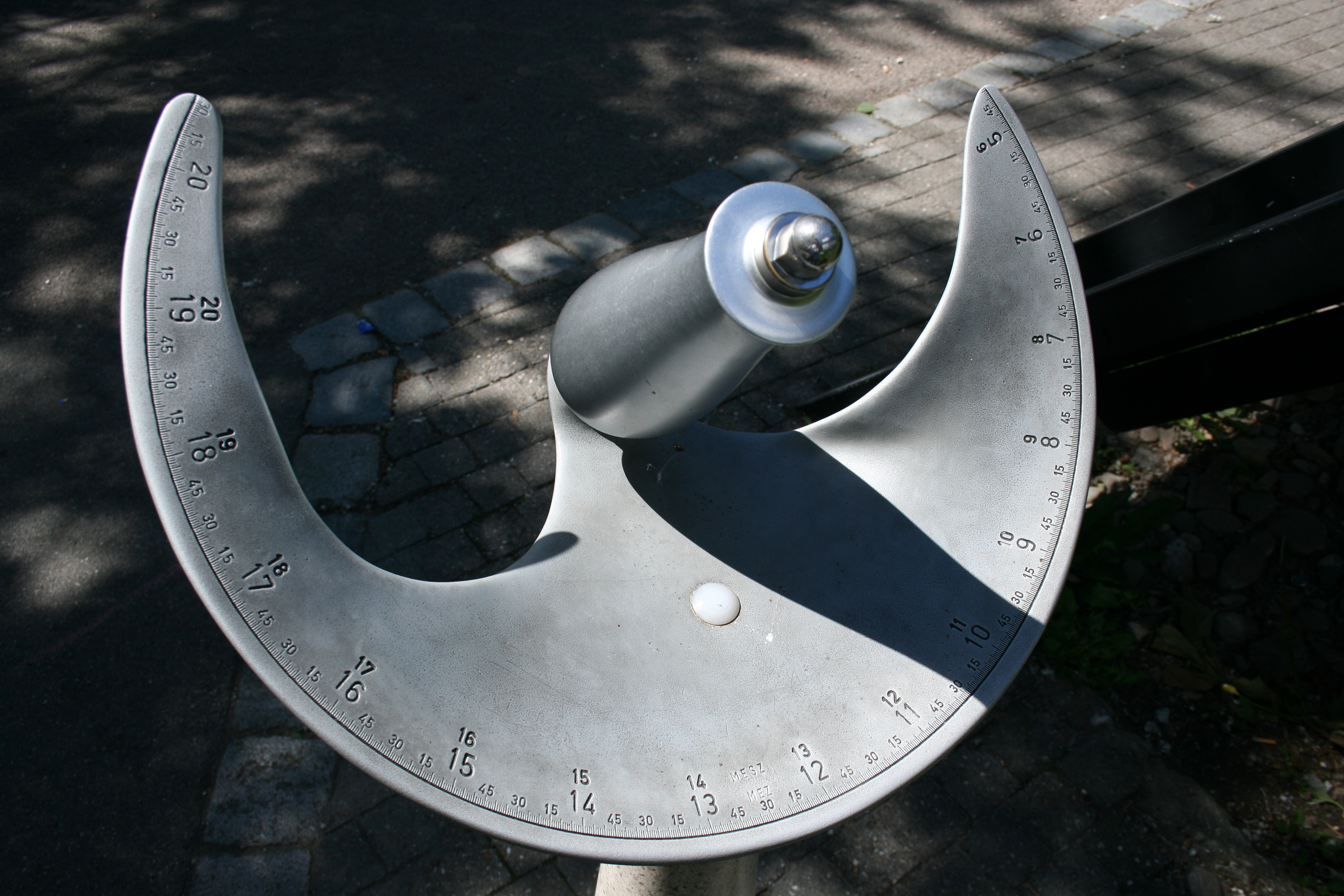
Martin Bernhardt created a special gnomon for an equatorial sundial which adjusts for the equation of time and allows one to read the time without knowing the date, to a precision of less than a minute.

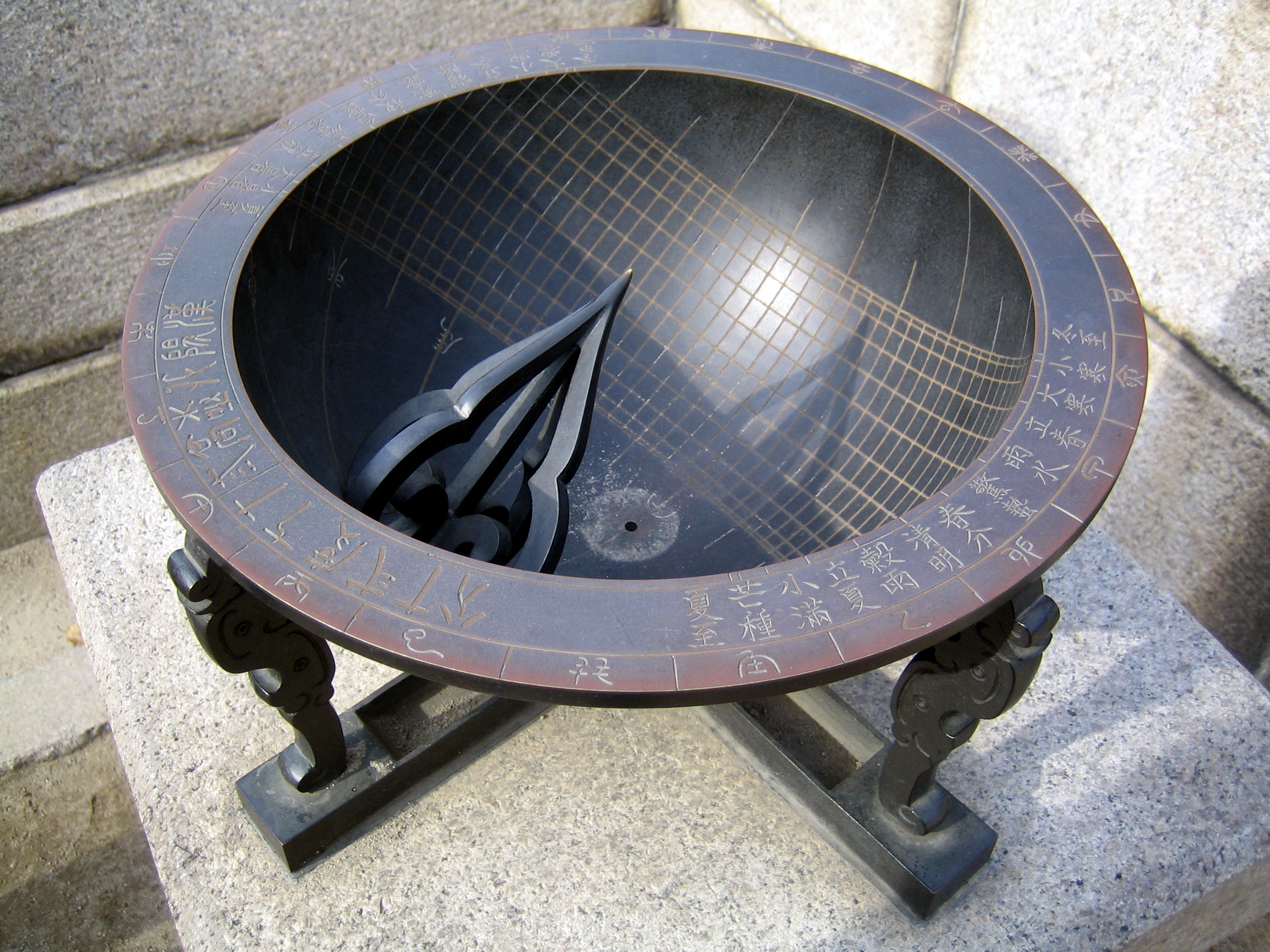
A modern hemispherium in Gyeongbok Palace in Seoul, South Korea. 37°34′43″N 126°58′38″E The pointer tip acts as the nodus; the height of the nodus-shadow gives the time of the year.

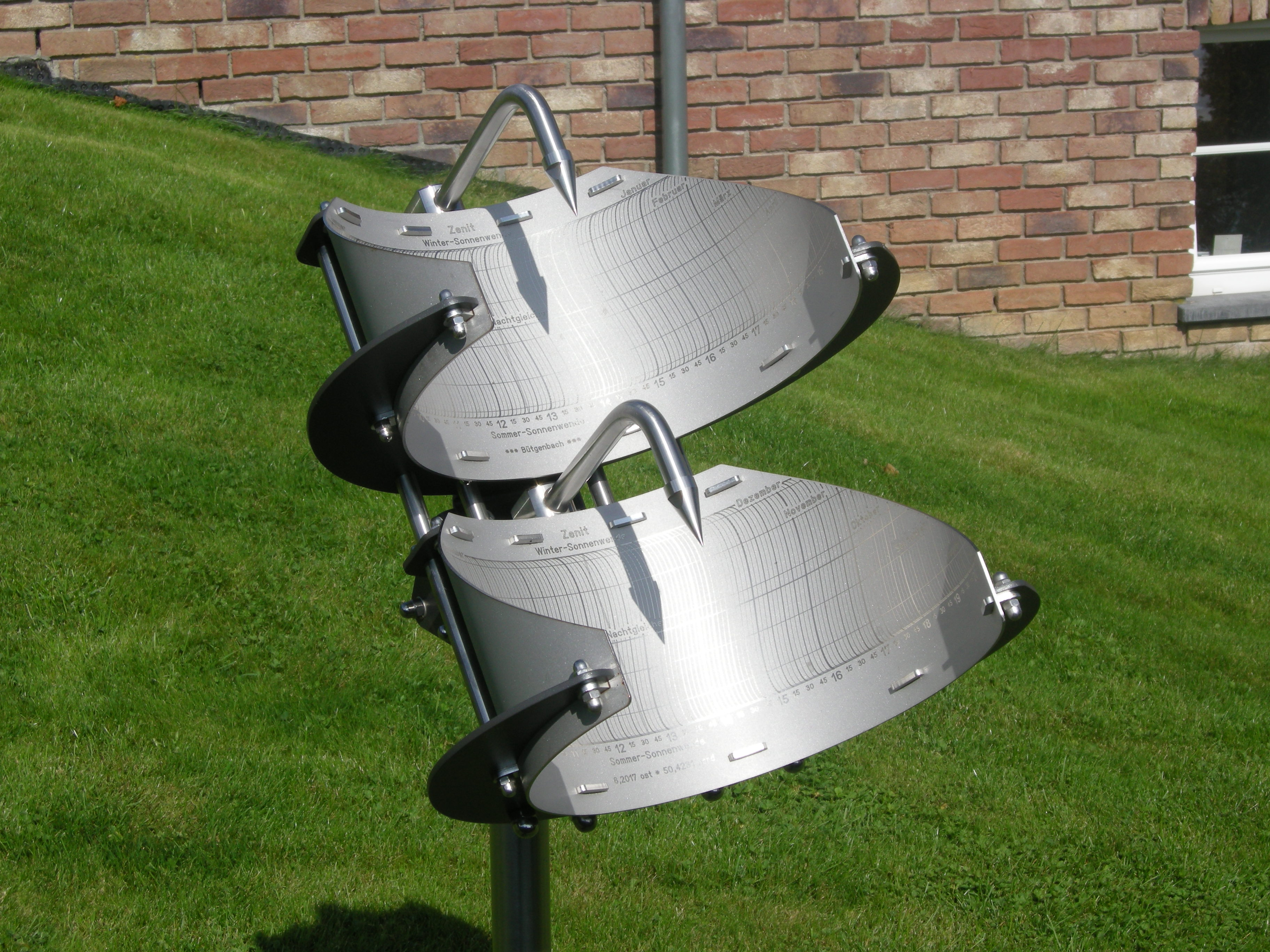
High precision (±30 seconds) sundial in Belgium (Google Earth)

== See also ==
- Foucault pendulum
- Francesco Bianchini
- Horology
- Scottish sundial — the ancient renaissance sundials of Scotland
- Tide dial — early sundials which show the canonical hours ("tides") of the day
- Wilanów Palace Sundial, created by Johannes Hevelius in about 1684

== Bibliography ==
- Earle AM (1971). Sundials and Roses of Yesterday. Rutland, VT: Charles E. Tuttle. ISBN 0-8048-0968-2. LCCN 74142763. Reprint of the 1902 book published by Macmillan (New York).
- Heath, Thomas Little (1911). "Theodosius of Tripolis" . In Chisholm, Hugh (ed.). Encyclopædia Britannica. Vol. 26 (11th ed.). Cambridge University Press. pp. 771–772.
- A. P. Herbert, Sundials Old and New, Methuen & Co. Ltd, 1967.
- Jones, Lawrence (December 2005). "The Sundial And Geometry". North American Sundial Society. 12 (4).
- Mayall RN, Mayall MW (1994). Sundials: Their Construction and Use (3rd ed.). Cambridge, MA: Sky Publishing. ISBN 0-933346-71-9.
- Hugo Michnik, Theorie einer Bifilar-Sonnenuhr, Astronomishe Nachrichten, 217(5190), p. 81-90, 1923
- Rohr RRJ (1996). Sundials: History, Theory, and Practice (translated by G. Godin ed.). New York: Dover. ISBN 0-486-29139-1. Slightly amended reprint of the 1970 translation published by University of Toronto Press (Toronto). The original was published in 1965 under the title Les Cadrans solaires by Gauthier-Villars (Montrouge, France).
- Frederick W. Sawyer, Bifilar gnomonics, JBAA (Journal of the British Astronomical association), 88(4):334–351, 1978
- Gerard L'E. Turner, Antique Scientific Instruments, Blandford Press Ltd. 1980 ISBN 0-7137-1068-3
- J.L. Heilbron, The sun in the church: cathedrals as solar observatories, Harvard University Press, 2001 ISBN 978-0-674-00536-5.
- Make A Sundial, (The Education Group British Sundial Society) Editors Jane Walker and David Brown, British Sundial Society 1991 ISBN 0-9518404-0-1
- Waugh AE (1973). Sundials: Their Theory and Construction. New York: Dover Publications. ISBN 0-486-22947-5.
- "Illustrating Shadows", Simon Wheaton-Smith, ISBN 0-9765286-8-1, LCN: 2005900674
