= Egyptian astrology =

Egyptian astrology may refer to:

- Ancient Egyptian astronomy
- Astrology in Hellenistic Egypt
