= Mass flow =

Mass flow may refer to:

- Mass flow (life sciences)
- Mass flow (physics)
