= Najm al-Din al-Misri =

14th century Egyptian astronomer

Najm al‐Dīn al‐Miṣrī (Arabic: نجم الدين المصري) was a 14th-century Egyptian astronomer mostly known for writing a large astronomical table that had nearly 415,000 entries. The table is considered to be the largest of its kind ever produced by one person during the Middle Ages. Although the main purpose of the work was astronomical timekeeping, it can also be used to solve all problems of spherical trigonometry by changing the arguments of the table. Najm al‐Din also wrote an important illustrated treatise that describes more than 100 different astronomical instruments, such as astrolabes, quadrants and sundials, including ones he invented himself. This work is of high importance for modern scholars and one of the main sources on the subject.
