= Equinoctial hours =

Dial of a wall-mounted sundial for simultaneous display of temporal (twelve hours, black) and equinoctial (red, digit at end of hour) daytime hours (At day-night equinox, both types of hours are of equal length.)

An equinoctial hour is one of the 24 equal parts of the full day (which includes daytime and nighttime).

Its length, unlike the temporal hour, does not vary with the season, but is constant. The measurement of the full day with equinoctial hours of equal length was first used about 2,400 years ago in Babylonia to make astronomical observations comparable regardless of the season. Our present hour is an equinoctial hour, freed only from its seasonal variation and from the small error due to some uniform Earth rotation, and realized by modern technical means (atomic clock, satellite and VLBI-Astrometry).

When the temporal hour was used, the daytime and nighttime, whose lengths vary greatly throughout the year, were each divided into 12 hours. This corresponded to the earlier sentiment and custom of not grouping the night with the daytime.

The name equinoctial hours refers to the fact that the temporal hours of the daytime (daylight hours) and those of the night are of equal length at each of the equinoxes.

== History ==
Equinoctial hours (Ancient Greek: ὥραι ἰσήμεραι, romanized: hōrai isēmerai) are found, in distinction to the Greek: ὥραι καιρικαί, romanized: horai kairikai, the 'unequal' hours, at least in Ancient Greece.

Geminos of Rhodes reported the observation of Pytheas of Massalia that the duration of the night depended on the geographical latitude of the place in question. However, it is not clear from his explanations whether he meant equal or equinoctial hours. Otto Neugebauer cites this account as the oldest testimony to the concept of hour (¹ra) as a defined measure of time.

The Babylonian calendar knew no division of the day into 24 time units, so Ancient Egyptian influence for this system can be considered probable. The period of its origin can be dated to the 4th century BC, since Pytheas of Massalia refers to the terminus G¨j perÐodoj introduced by Eudoxus of Cnidus.

The use of equinoctial hours was already familiar in the work of Hipparchus of Nicaea. In the appendix to his commentary on Aratos of Soloi and Eudoxos of Knidos, he uses the well-known 24-hour circles and names stars whose rises are separated from each other by about one equinoctial hour in certain seasons.

With the invention of the Stroke clock, for the first time one could read equinoctial hours mechanically without having to perform astronomical calculations. A mechanical clock displaying the previously used temporal hours would be very costly, but occasionally its construction was nevertheless attempted. Equinoctial hours are first attested in conjunction with striking clocks in Padua in 1344, in Genoa in 1353, and in Bologna in 1356. Subsequently, striking clocks came into use throughout Europe.

=== Equal hours in ancient Egypt ===
In Ancient Egypt, the earliest use of equal hours is attested by an inscription from the time of Amenophis I around 1525 BC. The use of water clocks allowed individual units of hours; for example, for the division of Decan star intervals, where fractions of hours were also taken into account.

Ten equivalent hours were used for the time between two sunrises.

=== Equal hours in Babylonia ===
The temporal hour was unknown to the Babylonians until the third century BC. However, attempts have been made to establish a second ideal calendar with seasonal hours alongside the astronomical system of equivalent hours. Bartel Leendert van der Waerden analyzed the "Babylonian system of the ideal calendar" in 1974:

The conversion of the BERU double hours does not correspond to the later Greek exact method, but represents only a very inaccurate division of the day.

— Bartel Leendert van der Waerden

Neugebauer reiterated this finding in 1975 as an important feature which distinguishes it from the later Greek temporal hours. The durations of the daytime and nighttime were measured by Babylonian astronomers with a gnomon and a water clock further in BERU as well as UŠ. The time periods were divided into equivalent time units with respect to celestial observation. The use of a gnomon together with a water clock is already documented in the MUL.APIN-cuneiform tablets around 700 BC.

From their contents it is clear that the values for the duration of the light day and night were recorded during four colures aligned with the longest and shortest days of the year. The records have gnomon tables, but they are preserved only for specific dates in the Hebrew calendar: the 15th of Nisan and the 15th of Tammuz. The tables for the 15th Tishrei and the 15th Tevet were at the beginning of the broken away second column. The gnomon tables are written in the form that the length of the gnomon corresponds to a Mesopotamian cubit, which measured between 40 and 50 cm.

A 24-hour day contained twelve Dannas, which in turn, taking into account the Babylonian model of the mean sun, comprised twelve equinoctial units, each lasting 120 minutes The equivalent hours had the Sumerian System of the distance covered on foot in broad daylight as a basis. The unit of measurement, which has a distance of about 10 km as a computational value, is also erroneously called "double hour" in modern literature.

== See also ==
- Epic of Gilgamesh
- Ancient Egyptian sundial
- Hour

== Literature ==
- Friedrich Karl Ginzel: Handbuch der mathematischen und technischen Chronologie, Vol. 1 - Zeitrechnung der Babylonier, Ägypter, Mohammedaner, Perser, Inder, Südostasiaten, Chinesen, Japaner und Zentralamerikaner -, Deutsche Buch-Ex- und Import, Leipzig 1958 (Reprint Leipzig 1906)
- Richard Anthony Parker: Egyptian Astronomy, Astrology and calendrical reckoning In: Charles-Coulson Gillispie: Dictionary of scientific Biography - American Council of Learned Societies - Vol. 15, Supplement 1 (Roger Adams, Ludwik Zejszner: Topical essays), Scribner, New York 1978, ISBN 0-684-14779-3, pp. 706–727.
- François Thureau-Dangin: Itanerare - Babylonische Doppelstunde -. In: Dietz Otto Edzard: Reallexikon der Assyriologie und vorderasiatischen Archäologie. Vol. 5: Ia to Kizzuwatna, de Gruyter, Berlin 1980, ISBN 3-11-007192-4, p. 218.
- François Thureau-Dangin: Rituels Accadiens Leroux, Paris 1921, p. 133.
- Wolfgang Fels: Marcus Manilus: Astronomica - (Latin–German. published by Reclam, Stuttgart 1990, ISBN 3-15-008634-5.
- Friedrich-Karl Ginzel: Handbuch der mathematischen und technischen Chronologie II - Das Zeitrechnungswesen der Völker: Zeitrechnung der Juden, der Naturvölker, der Römer und Griechen sowie Nachträge zum 1. Bande. Deutscher Buch-Ex- und Import, Leipzig 1958 (Reprint of first edition Leipzig 1911).
- Otto Neugebauer: A history of ancient mathematical astronomy. Studies in the history of mathematics and physical sciences, Vols. 1–3. Springer, Berlin 2006, ISBN 3-540-06995-X (Reprint of 1975 Berlin edition).
