= Mass flow (life sciences) =

Movement of fluids down a pressure or temperature gradient

In the life sciences, mass flow, also known as mass transfer and bulk flow, is the movement of fluids down a pressure gradient or a temperature gradient. As such, mass flow is a subject of study in both fluid dynamics and biology. Examples of mass flow include blood circulation and transport of water in vascular plant tissues. Mass flow is not to be confused with diffusion which depends on concentration gradients within a medium rather than pressure gradients of the medium itself.

== Plant biology ==
In general, bulk flow in plant biology typically refers to the movement of water from the soil up through the plant to the leaf tissue through xylem, but can also be applied to the transport of larger solutes (e.g. sucrose) through the phloem.

=== Xylem ===
According to cohesion-tension theory, water transport in xylem relies upon the cohesion of water molecules to each other and adhesion to the vessel's wall via hydrogen bonding combined with the high water pressure of the plant's substrate and low pressure of the extreme tissues (usually leaves).

As in blood circulation in animals, (gas) embolisms may form within one or more xylem vessels of a plant. If an air bubble forms, the upward flow of xylem water will stop because the pressure difference in the vessel cannot be transmitted. Once these embolisms are nucleated, the remaining water in the capillaries begins to turn to water vapor. When these bubbles form rapidly by cavitation, the "snapping" sound can be used to measure the rate of cavitation within the plant . Plants do, however, have physiological mechanisms to reestablish the capillary action within their cells.

=== Phloem ===
Solute flow is driven by a difference in hydraulic pressure created from the unloading of solutes in the sink tissues. That is, as solutes are off-loaded into sink cells (by active or passive transport), the density of the phloem liquid decreases locally, creating a pressure gradient.

== See also ==
- Countercurrent exchange
- Pounds per hour
- Fluid dynamics
- Mass flow rate
- Hemorheology
- Flying and gliding animals
