= Egyptian astronomy =

Astronomy in Egypt

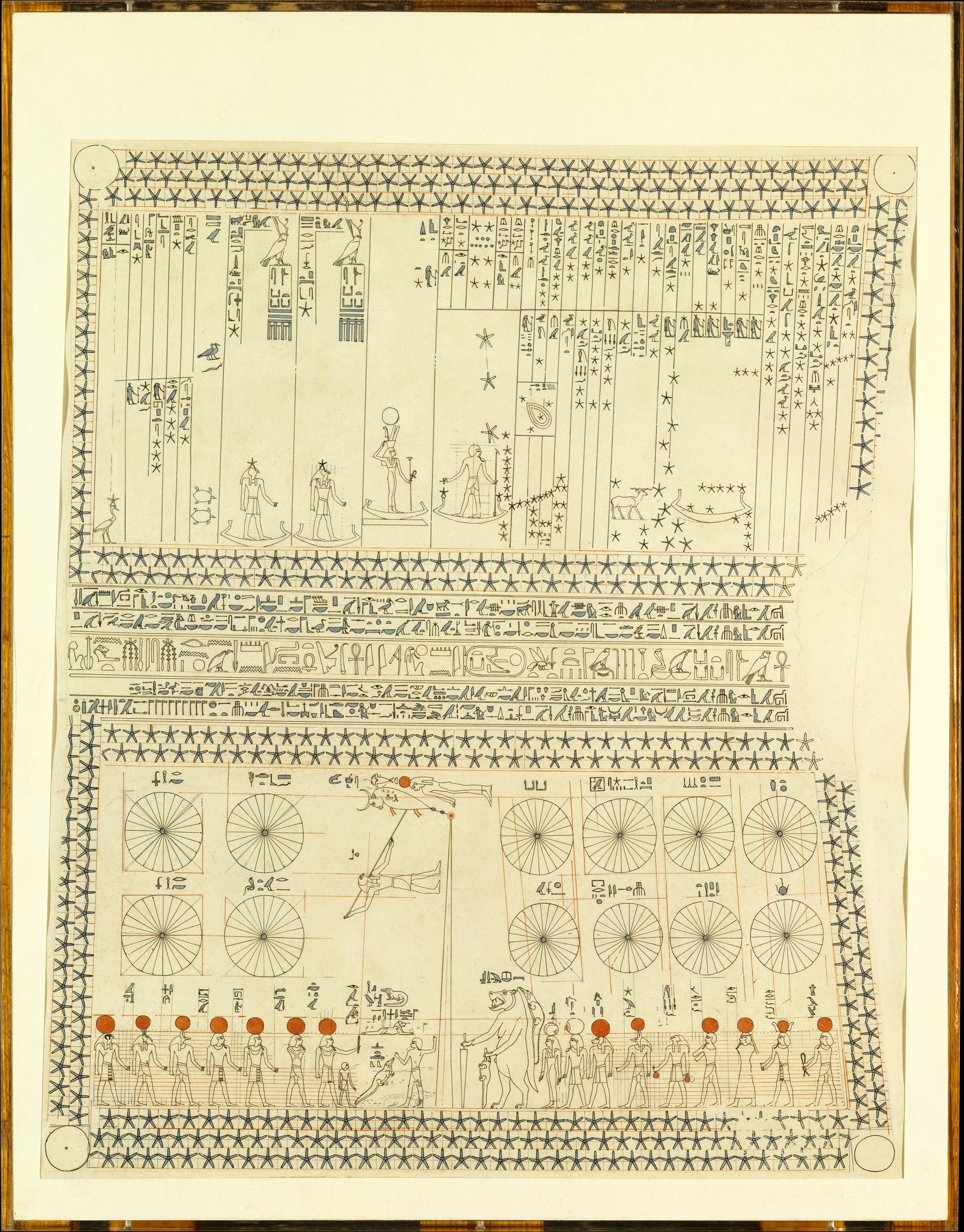
Astronomical ceiling from the Tomb of Senenmut (XVIII Dynasty, circa 1479–1458 BCE), discovered in Thebes, Upper Egypt; facsimile preserved in the Metropolitan Museum of Art.

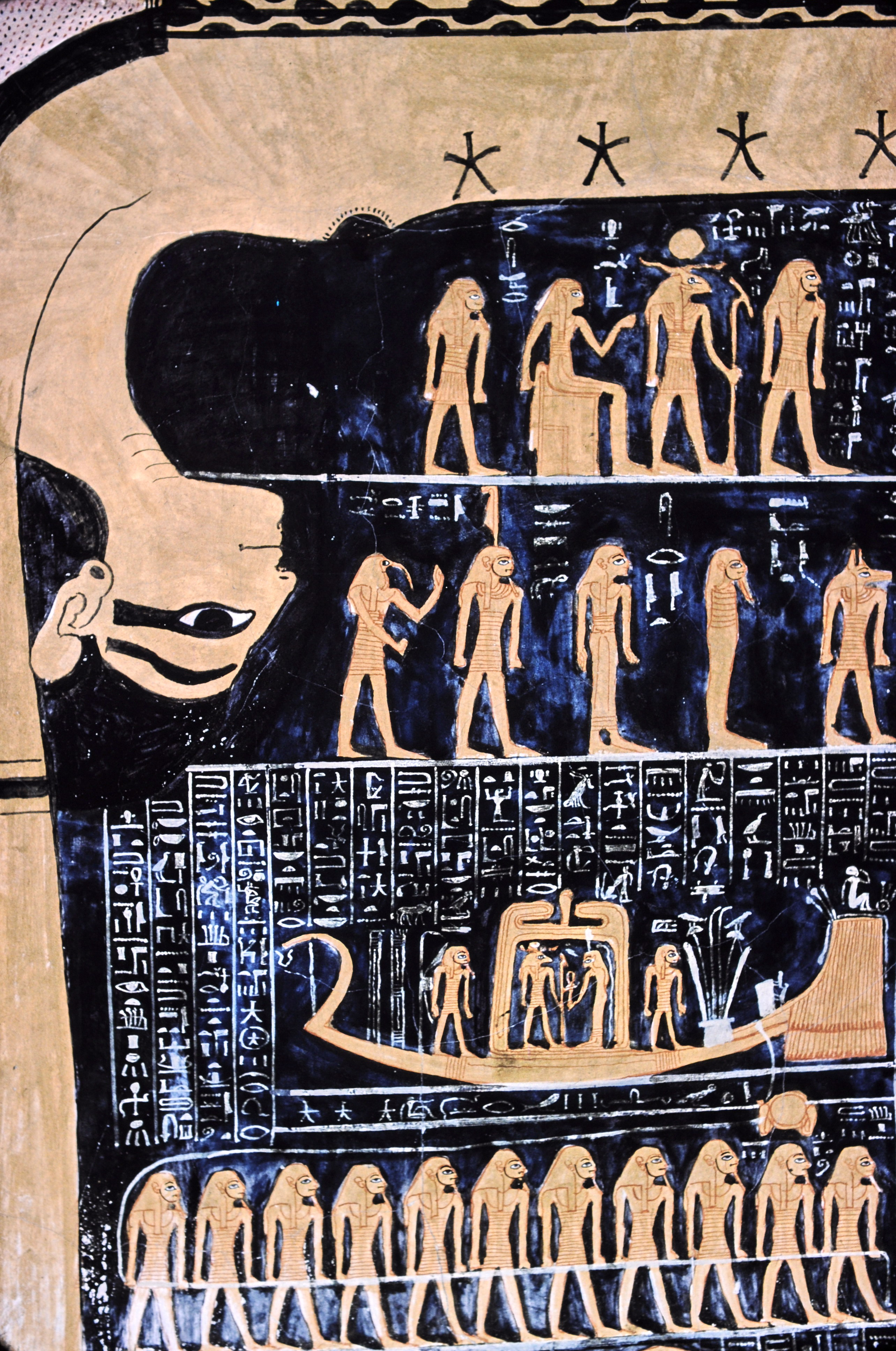
The sky goddess Nut and human figures representing stars and constellations from the star chart in the tomb of Ramses VI, c. 1140 BC

Egyptian astronomy started in prehistoric times, in the Predynastic Period. In the 5th millennium BCE, the stone circles at Nabta Playa may have made use of astronomical alignments. By the time the historical Dynastic Period began in the 3rd millennium BCE, the 365 day period of the Egyptian calendar was already in use, and the observation of stars was important in determining the annual flooding of the Nile.

The Egyptian pyramids were carefully aligned towards the pole star, and the temple of Amun-Re at Karnak was aligned on the rising of the midwinter Sun. Astronomy played a considerable part in fixing the dates of religious festivals and determining the hours of night, and temple astrologers were especially adept at watching the stars and observing the conjunctions and risings of the Sun, Moon, and planets, as well as the lunar phases.

In Ptolemaic Egypt, the Egyptian tradition merged with Greek astronomy and Babylonian astronomy, with the city of Alexandria in Lower Egypt becoming the centre of scientific activity across the Hellenistic world. Roman Egypt produced the greatest astronomer of the era, Ptolemy (90–168 CE). His works on astronomy, including the Almagest, became the most influential books in the history of Western astronomy. In Medieval Egypt, the region came to be dominated by Arabic culture and Islamic astronomy.

The astronomer Ibn Yunus (c. 950–1009) observed the Sun's position for many years using a large astrolabe, and his observations on eclipses were still used centuries later. In 1006, Ali ibn Ridwan observed the SN 1006, a supernova regarded as the brightest stellar event in recorded history, and left the most detailed description of it. In the 14th century, Najm al-Din al-Misri wrote a treatise describing over 100 different types of scientific and astronomical instruments, many of which he invented himself.

== Ancient Egypt ==
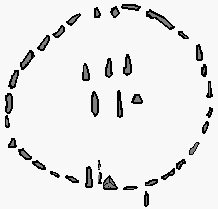
Plan of a stone circle at Nabta Playa

Egyptian astronomy may date back to prehistoric times. The presence of stone circles at Nabta Playa in Lower Nubia (within the borders of modern Egypt but south of the border of Ancient Egypt) dating from the 5th millennium BCE indicates the importance of astronomy to the religious life of prehistoric people in the vicinity of ancient Egypt. The annual flooding of the Nile meant that the heliacal risings, or first visible appearances of stars at dawn, were of special interest in determining when this might occur. The 365 day period of the Egyptian calendar was already in use at the beginning of Egyptian history. The constellation system used among the Egyptians also appears to have been essentially of native origin.

The precise orientation of the Egyptian pyramids serves as a lasting demonstration of the high degree of technical skill attained in the 3rd millennium BCE. It has been shown the pyramids were aligned towards the pole star, which, because of the precession of the equinoxes, was at that time Thuban, a faint star in the constellation of Draco. Evaluation of the site of the temple of Amun-Re at Karnak, taking into account the change over time of the obliquity of the ecliptic, has shown that the Great Temple was aligned on the rising of the midwinter Sun. The length of the corridor down which sunlight would travel would have limited illumination at other times of the year.

Astronomy played a considerable part in religious matters for fixing the dates of festivals and determining the hours of the night. The titles of several temple books are preserved recording the movements and phases of the Sun, Moon and stars. The rising of Sirius (Egyptian: Sopdet, Greek: Sothis) at the beginning of the inundation was a particularly important point to fix in the yearly calendar. One of the most important Egyptian astronomical texts was the Book of Nut, going back to the Middle Kingdom or earlier.

For Ancient Egyptians, the death of a king had a strong connection to the stars. They believed once a king was deceased, their soul would rise to the heavens and become a star. The Pyramid Texts describe the king ascending and becoming the Morning Star among the Imperishable Stars of past kings.

=== First Intermediate Period ===
Beginning with the 9th Dynasty, ancient Egyptians produced 'Diagonal star tables', which were usually painted on the inside surface of wooden coffin lids. This practice continued until the 12th dynasty. These 'Diagonal star tables' or star charts are also known as 'diagonal star clocks'. In the past they have also been known as 'star calendars', or 'decanal clocks'. These star charts featuring the paintings of Egyptian deities, decans, constellations, and star observations are also found on the ceilings of tombs and temples.

=== New Kingdom Period ===
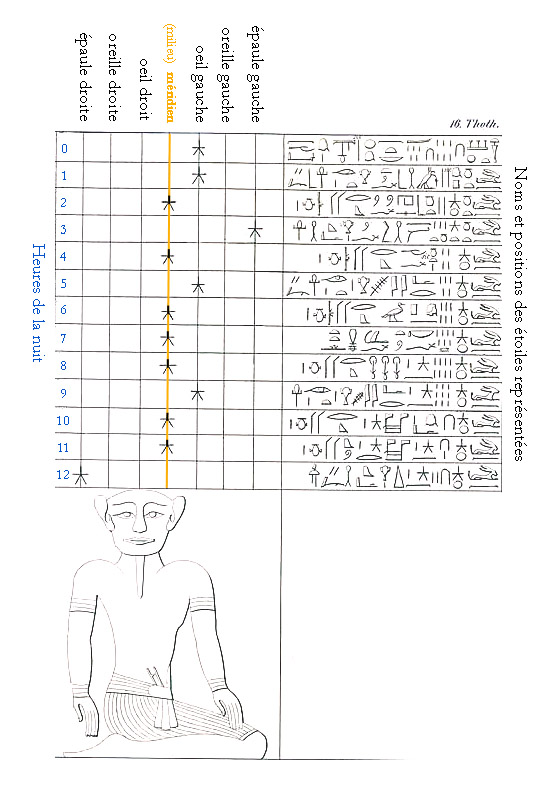
'Star clock' method from the tomb of Rameses VI

From the tables of stars on the ceiling of the tombs of Rameses VI and Rameses IX (late New Kingdom period) it seems that for fixing the hours of the night a man seated on the ground faced the Astrologer in such a position that the line of observation of the pole star passed over the middle of his head. On the different days of the year each hour was determined by a fixed star culminating or nearly culminating in it, and the position of these stars at the time is given in the tables as in the centre, on the left eye, on the right shoulder, etc. According to the texts, in founding or rebuilding temples the north axis was determined by the same apparatus, and we may conclude that it was the usual one for astronomical observations. In careful hands, it might give results of a high degree of accuracy.

=== Late Period ===
Macrobius Ambrosius Theodosius (floruit 395–423 CE) attributed the planetary theory where the Earth rotates on its axis and the interior planets Mercury and Venus revolve around the Sun which in turn revolves around the Earth, to the ancient Egyptians. He called it the "Egyptian System", and stated that "it did not escape the skill of the Egyptians", though there is no other evidence it was known in ancient Egypt.

=== Greco-Roman Egypt ===
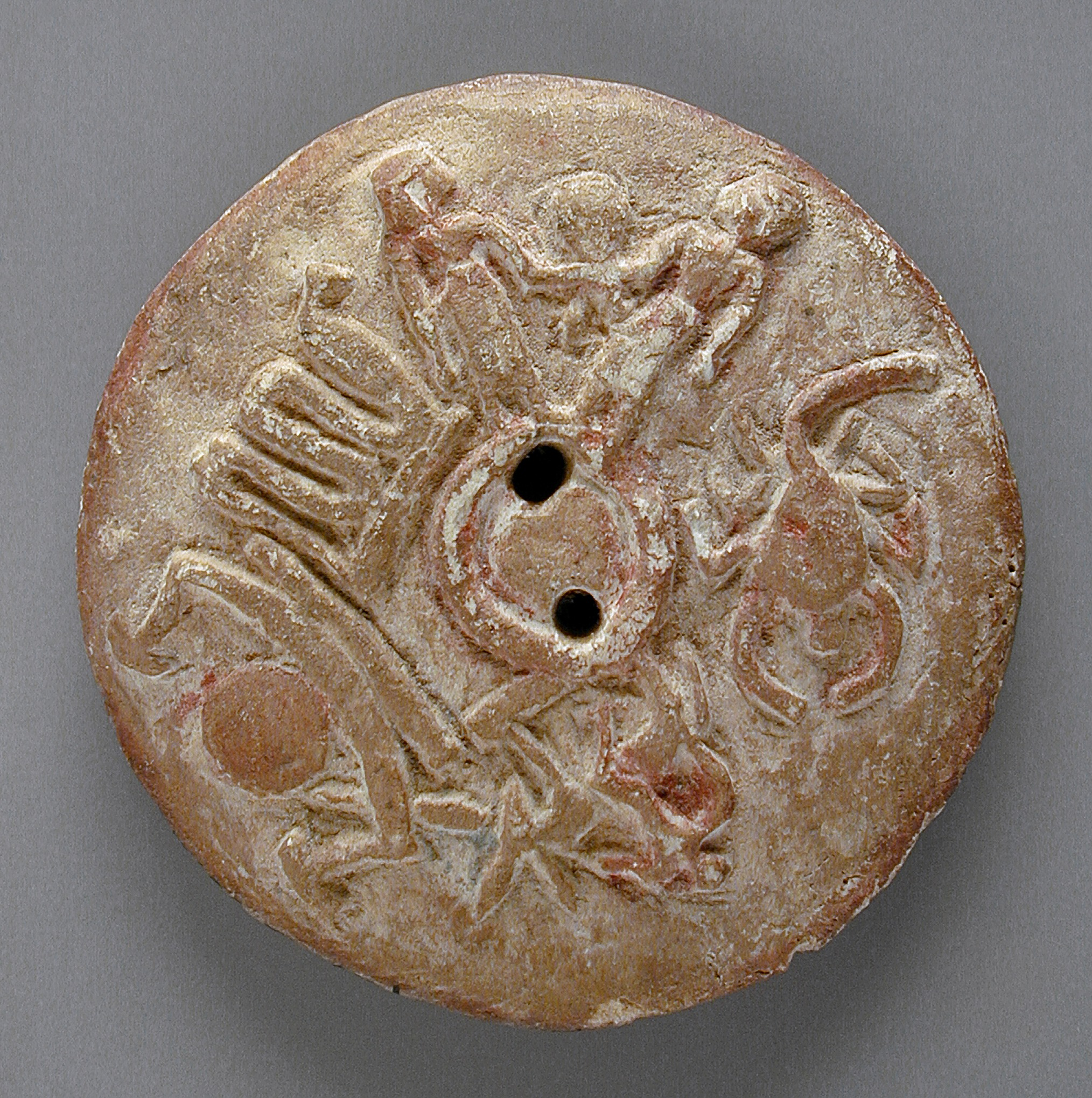
An Egyptian 30th dynasty (Ptolemaic) terracotta astrological disc at the Los Angeles County Museum of Art.

Writing in the Roman era, Clement of Alexandria gives some idea of the importance of astronomical observations to the sacred rites:

And after the Singer advances the Astrologer (ὡροσκόπος), with a horologium (ὡρολόγιον) in his hand, and a palm (φοίνιξ), the symbols of astrology. He must know by heart the Hermetic astrological books, which are four in number. Of these, one is about the arrangement of the fixed stars that are visible; one on the positions of the sun and moon and five planets; one on the conjunctions and phases of the sun and moon; and one concerns their risings.

The astrologer's instruments (horologium and palm) are a plumb line and sighting instrument. They have been identified with two inscribed objects in the Berlin Museum; a short handle from which a plumb line was hung, and a palm branch with a sight-slit in the broader end. In the Ancient Egyptian language they were referred to as the merkhet and bay respectively. The palm branch was held close to the eye, the plumb line in the other hand – perhaps at arm's length. (Note: The "Hermetic" books which Clement refers to are the Egyptian theological texts, which probably have nothing to do with Hellenistic Hermetism.)

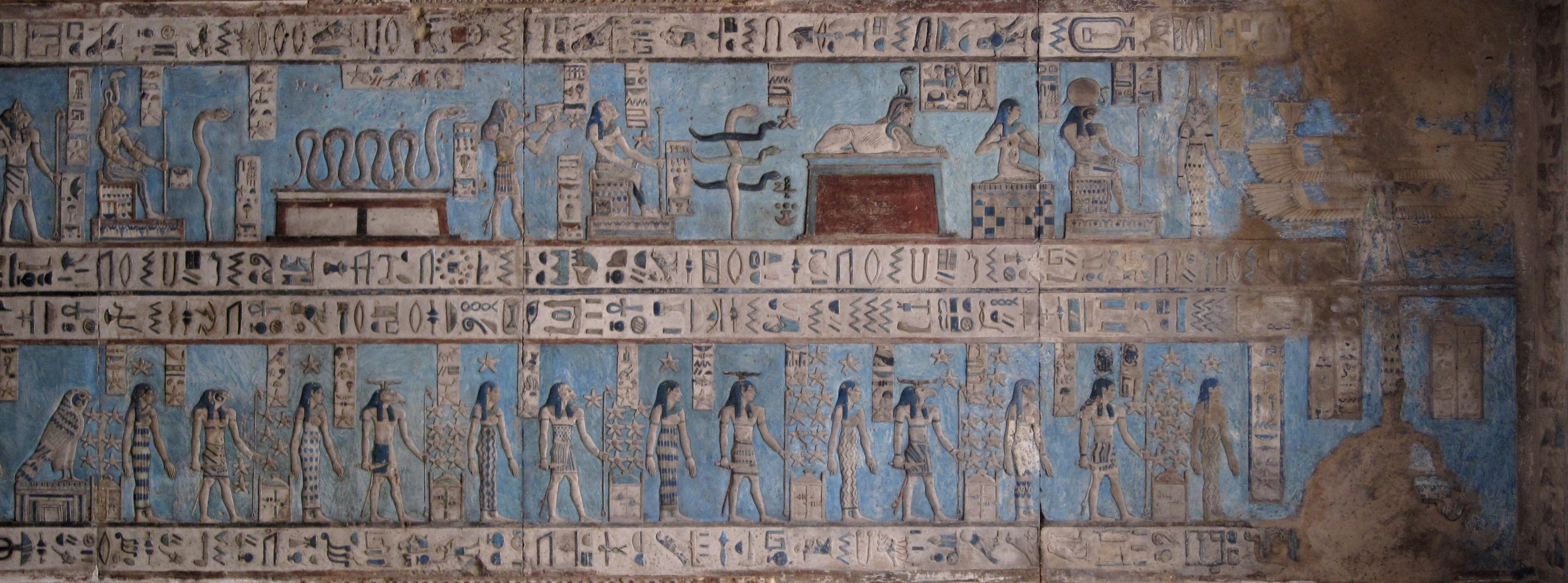
Astronomical ceiling relief from Dendera, Egypt

Following Alexander the Great's conquests and the foundation of Ptolemaic Egypt, the native Egyptian tradition of astronomy had merged with Greek astronomy as well as Babylonian astronomy. The city of Alexandria in Lower Egypt became the centre of scientific activity throughout the Hellenistic civilization. The greatest Alexandrian astronomer of this era was the Greek, Eratosthenes (c. 276–195 BCE), who calculated the size of the Earth, providing an estimate for the circumference of the Earth.

Following the Roman conquest of Egypt, the region once again became the centre of scientific activity throughout the Roman Empire. The greatest astronomer of this era was the Hellenic Egyptian, Claudius Ptolemy (90–168 CE). Originating from the Thebaid region of Upper Egypt, he worked at Alexandria and wrote works on astronomy including the Almagest, the Planetary Hypotheses, and the Tetrabiblos, as well as the Handy Tables, the Canobic Inscription, and other works unrelated to astronomy.

Ptolemy's Almagest (originally titled The Mathematical Syntaxis) is one of the most influential books in the history of Western astronomy. In this book, Ptolemy explained how to predict the behavior of the planets with the introduction of a new mathematical idea, the equant.

A few mathematicians of late Antiquity wrote commentaries on the Almagest, including Pappus of Alexandria as well as Theon of Alexandria and his daughter Hypatia. Ptolemaic astronomy became standard in medieval western European and Islamic astronomy until it was displaced by Maraghan, heliocentric, and Tychonic systems by the 16th century.

== Medieval Egypt ==
Following the Muslim conquest of Egypt, The region came to be dominated by Arabic culture. It was ruled by the Rashidun, Umayyad and Abbasid Caliphates up until the 10th century, when the Fatimids founded their own Caliphate centred around the city of Cairo in Egypt. The region once again became a centre of scientific activity, competing with Baghdad for intellectual dominance in the medieval Islamic world. By the 13th century, the city of Cairo eventually overtook Baghdad as the intellectual center of the Islamic world.

Ibn Yunus (c. 950–1009) observed more than 10,000 entries for the Sun's position for many years using a large astrolabe with a diameter of nearly 1.4 meters. His observations on eclipses were still used centuries later in Simon Newcomb's investigations on the motion of the Moon, while his other observations inspired Laplace's Obliquity of the Ecliptic and Inequalities of Jupiter and Saturn. In 1006, Ali ibn Ridwan observed the supernova of 1006, regarded as the brightest stellar event in recorded history, and left the most detailed description of the temporary star. He says that the object was two to three times as large as the disc of Venus and about one-quarter the brightness of the Moon, and that the star was low on the southern horizon.

The astrolabic quadrant was invented in Egypt in the 11th century or 12th century, and later known in Europe as the "Quadrans Vetus" (Old Quadrant). In 14th century Egypt, Najm al-Din al-Misri (c. 1325) wrote a treatise describing over 100 different types of scientific and astronomical instruments, many of which he invented himself.

== See also ==
- Ancient Egypt
- Archaeoastronomy
- Dendera zodiac
- Decans, Egyptian constellations.
- Egyptian astronomers
- Egyptian calendar
- Egyptian mathematics
- History of astronomy
  - Babylonian astronomy
  - Ancient Greek astronomy
  - Medieval Islamic astronomy
- Nabta Playa
- Sothic cycle
