= Quadrans Vetus =

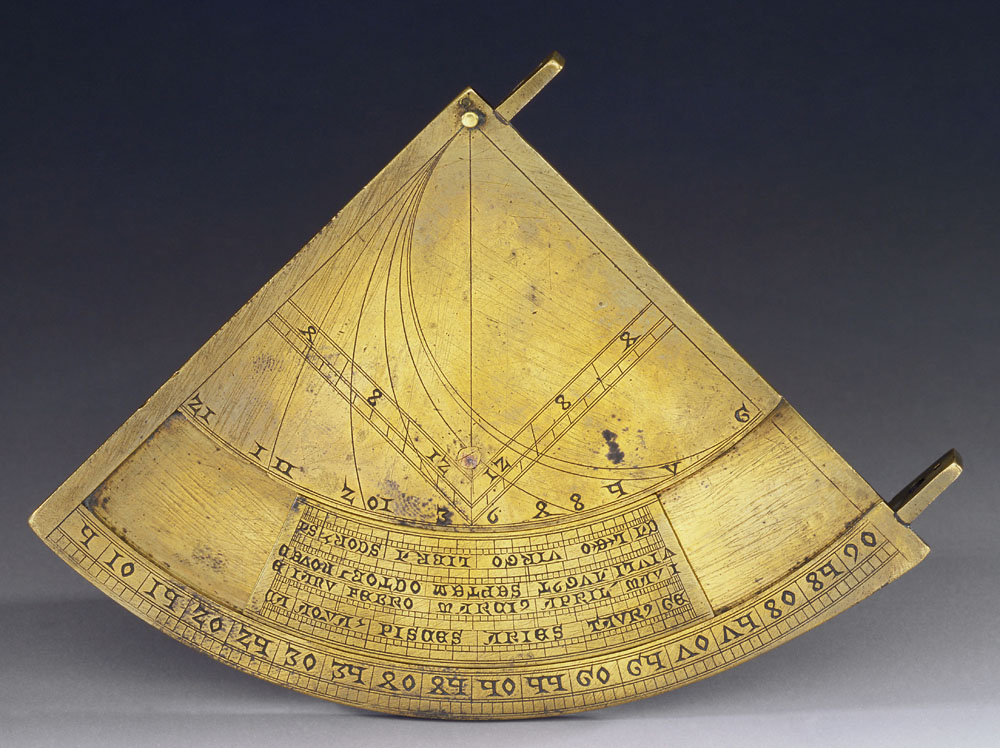
The Quadrans Vetus. Medici collections, Museo Galileo

The Quadrans Vetus is a medieval astronomical instrument.

Known as the quadrans vetus ["old quadrant"], the three surviving medieval examples are in the Museo Galileo in Florence, the Museum of the History of Science in Oxford, and the British Museum in London.

There are two sights on one of the straight sides. The front carries the shadow square, the hour lines, and a mobile zodiacal cursor in its guide, to be positioned for the desired latitude. The back is inscribed with the zodiacal calendar. The instrument displays Gothic characters. Designed to measure heights, distances, and depths, the instrument could also be used as a universal dial. A similar quadrant is documented in a drawing by Antonio da Sangallo the Younger (c. 1520?) at the Gabinetto dei Disegni e delle Stampe (Department of Drawings and Prints) of the Uffizi.

== Bibliography ==
Mara Miniati, ed. (1991). Museo di storia della scienza: catalogo (in Italian). Firenze: Giunti. p. 8, board n. 10. ISBN 88-09-20036-5.

Anthony J. Turner, ed. (2007). Catalogue of sun-dials, nocturnals and related instruments (in Italian). Firenze: Giunti. pp. 34–38, board n. 3. ISBN 978-88-09-04999-4.
