= Globe of Matelica =

Ancient Greek sundial

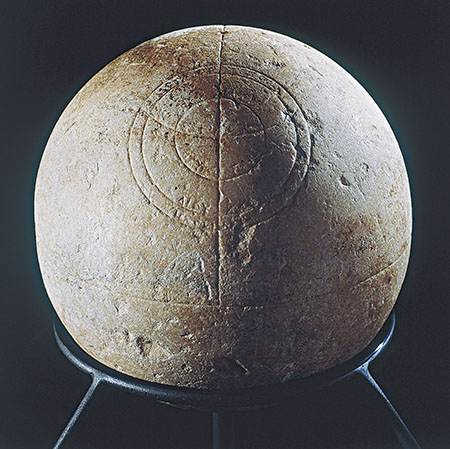

The Globe of Matelica (Globo of Matelica) is an Ancient Greek sundial sculpted on a marble ball. The artifact was found during the 1985 reconstruction of the medieval Palazzo Pretorio, presently Museo Civico Archeologico, of Matelica in the Marches, region of Italy.

== Description ==
The globe measures nearly 29 cm in diameter and appears to be sculpted from a crystalline marble originating near Ephesus in present-day Turkey. It is thought to date from the first two centuries CE. There is one similar item, identified in 1939 by Carl William Blegen in a Museum in Nafplio, Greece.

All that remains is the stone component, which is engraved with a variety of inscribed lines and letters. The sphere is bisected by a center line, while on its top are three concentric circles of various diameters, intersected by an arc of a circle and on which words in ancient Greek alphabet are still visible. Additionally it features 13 holes, each marked by a Greek letter. In these holes there were - probably - metallic insertions that delineated the hour.

In the lower part there is a large conical depression which ends with a big rectangular hole, likely made to secure the base. Other theories for the sphere are that it was used for astronomical calculations, thus as an armillary sphere or for use in spherical astronomy.

== See also ==
- Farnese Atlas
