= Pound per hour =

Mass flow unit

Pound per hour is a mass flow unit based on the international avoirdupois pound, which is used in both the British imperial and, being a former colony of Britain, the United States customary systems of measurement. It is abbreviated as PPH, or more conventionally as lb/h. Fuel flow for engines may be expressed using this unit. It is particularly useful when dealing with gases or liquids, as volume flow varies more with temperature and pressure.

In the US utility industry, steam and water flows throughout turbine cycles are typically expressed in PPH, while in almost all of the rest of the world these mass flows are expressed using the International System of Units (SI), the modern form of the metric system.

Conversions
1 lb/h	=	0.4535927	kilogram per hour (kg/h)
	=	125.9979	milligram per second (mg/s)
1000 lb/h	=	453.5927	kilogram per hour (kg/h)
	=	0.4535927	tonne per hour (t/h)
	=	125.9979	gram per second (g/s)
	=	0.1259979	kilogram per second (kg/s)

Minimum fuel intake on a jumbo jet can be as low as 150 lb/h (68 kg/h) when idling; however, this is not enough to sustain flight.
