= Unequal hours =

A system where hour lengths are unequal or not all 60 minutes

Dial of a wall-mounted sundial for the simultaneous display of temporal (black) and equinoctial (red) daylight hours with a dot-shaped shadow (Nodus). The equinoctial hours are equal to the temporal hours at the equinoxes; the lines of both types of hours intersect.

Unequal hours are the division of the daytime and the nighttime into 12 sections each, whatever the season. They are also called temporal hours, seasonal hours, biblical or Jewish hours, as well as ancient or Roman hours (Latin: horae temporales). They are unequal duration periods of time because days are longer and nights shorter in summer than in winter. Their use in everyday life was replaced in the late Middle Ages by the now common ones of equal duration.

The first temporal hour of daylight begins at sunrise, the first of night at sunset. For example, if daylight and night are each divided into twelve temporal hours, midday and midnight are each the beginning of the seventh hour.

A clock that displays the temporal hours is called a temporal clock.

== Astronomical basics ==
To the concept of light day corresponds the astronomical concept Day arc of the Sun. With the exception of the equator, the duration of daylight depends on the latitude and the season. At 49° north/south latitude (e.g., in Karlsruhe), it varies between 16 equinoctal hours in summer and 8 equinoctial hours in winter.

Due to the continuous change of the duration of daylight over the course of the year, the duration of the day division, i.e. the temporal day hours and the temporal night hours, also changes over the year.

The temporal hours of day and night are equal only at the spring and autumn equinoxes.

From 66.5° north/south latitude (polar circles) the sun no longer sets (the horizon) every day in summer and rises every day in winter. Day does not occur.

== History ==
Temporal hours were common in many cultures. A division of day and night into twelve hours each was first recorded in Ancient Egypt. A similar division of day and night was later made in the Mediterranean basin from about Classical Greek Antiquity into twelve temporal hours each (Ancient Greek: ὥραι καιρικαί, romanized: horai kairikai).

In Western culture they were adopted from the Roman calendar and were adopted in the European Medieval era. They had particular relevance in the fixed daily schedule of the monastic orders. This division of time allowed the work of the day -such as eating, praying, or working -to always be performed at the same (temporal) hour, regardless of season (Prayer of the Hours).

This chronology is used by Jewish religious law (Halacha), hence the Jewish Halachic division of hours.

Mechanical clocks encouraged the adoption of equinoctial hours.

== Temporal time ==
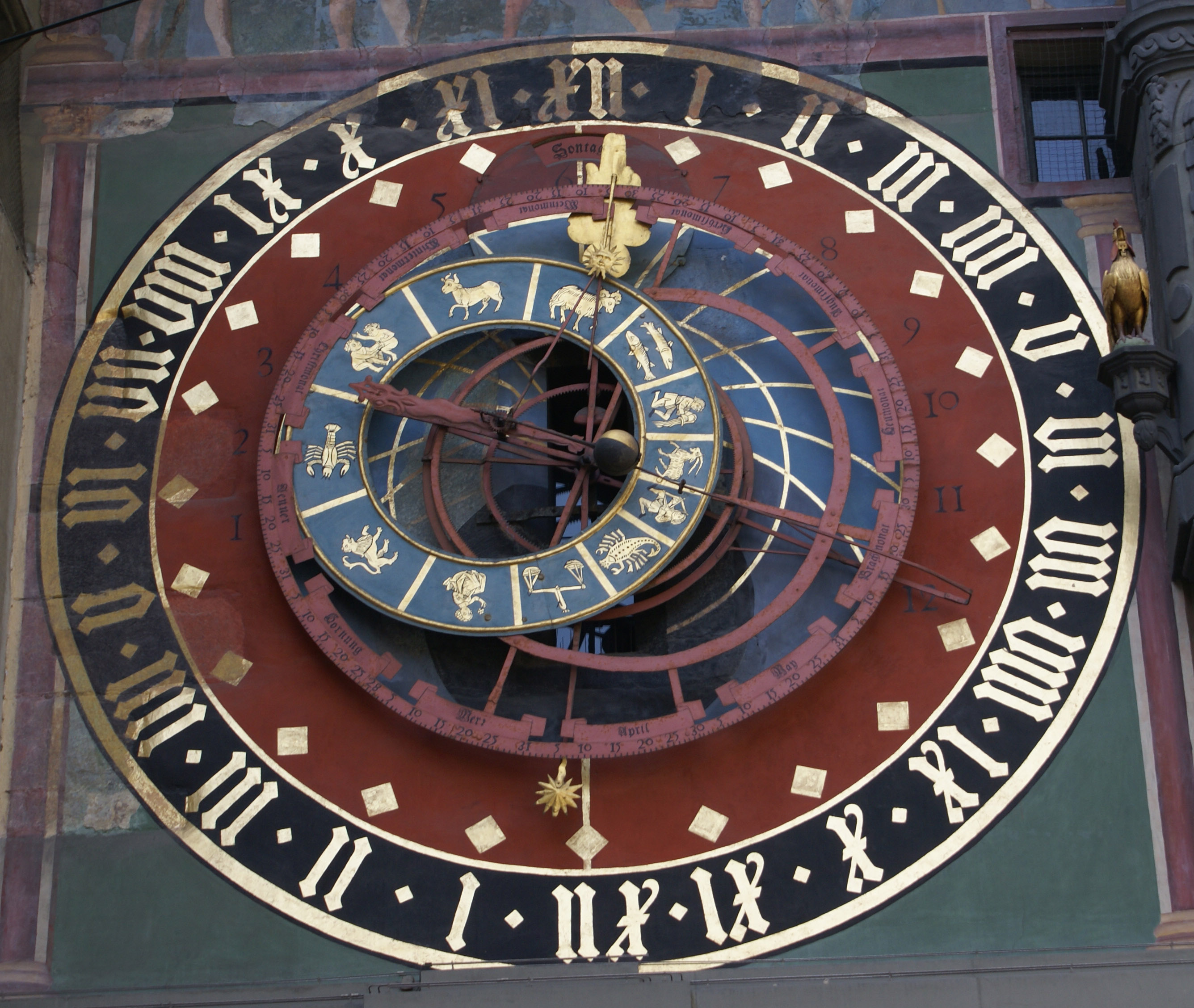
The astronomical clock of the Zytglogge in Bern shows the temporal hours on curved golden lines: respective end of the hour indicated with a black number.

For the display of temporal hours almost exclusively the sundial with Nodus as hand was once used. The position of the Sun, which varied throughout the year, served as a parameter on which the varying duration of the temporal hours during the year depended.

Many astronomical clocks created during the transition to the equal-duration equinoctial hours display temporal hours in addition to the new equal-duration hours.

Even where temporal hours continued to be used (especially in monasteries), the mechanical clock was used. This required two different settings for the day and for the night, or one clock each for the day and the night. For the latter, the speed of the verge escapement (Waag) was changed, for example, in 26 steps (i.e., half the numerical value of 52 weeks). In the weeks of the equinox, both clocks could be operated with the middle weight position on the balance.

== See also ==
- Twilight
- Terminator (solar)
- Diurnal climate (in German)
- Time perception
- Civil time
- equinoctial hours
- equal hours
- Danna
- Julian day
- Chronobiology
- Ancient Egyptian day

== Bibliography ==
- Karlheinz Deußer: Temporaluhren: Die Suche nach mechanischen Uhren, die mit Temporalstunden liefen. In: Jahresschrift der deutschen Gesellschaft für Chronometrie. Band 51, 2012, S. 143–160.
- Jürgen Osing: Hieratische Papyri aus Tebtunis I (Carsten Niebuhr Institute of Ancient Eastern Studies Copenhagen). Museum Tusculanum Press, Copenhagen 1998, ISBN 8-7728-9280-3.
- Rudolf Wendorff: Zeit und Kultur. Geschichte des Zeitbewusstseins in Europa. Westdeutscher Vlg, Wiesbaden 1980, ISBN 3-531-11515-4.
