= Holy Synod of the Coptic Orthodox Church =

Highest Orthodox authority in the Coptic Orthodox Church of Alexandria

The Holy Synod of the Coptic Orthodox Church of Alexandria is the highest Orthodox authority in the Coptic Orthodox Church. It formulates the rules and regulations regarding matters of the Church's organisation and faith.

The synod is chaired by the patriarch of Alexandria and the members are the Church's metropolitan archbishops, metropolitan bishops, diocesan bishops, patriarchal exarchs, missionary bishops, auxiliary bishops, suffragan bishops, assistant bishops, chorbishops and the patriarchal vicars of the Church of Alexandria.

== Seniority ==
According to Coptic Orthodox Church of Alexandria traditions, the pope, being the bishop of Alexandria and being the senior and elder bishop and the metropolitan archbishop of the province and primate of all Egypt, is the head of the Holy Synod as a first among equals. The most senior position after the pope was that of the metropolitan archbishop of Pentapolis, but since it ceased to be a major archiepiscopal metropolis in the days of Pope John VI it has been held as a titular see attached to another metropolis.

There is a special status of seniority of honor and precedence for the metropolitan archbishop of the Holy and Great City of Our Lord, Jerusalem, Holy Zion, archbishop of the Holy Archdiocese of Jerusalem, All Palestine, Philadelphia of Jordan and All the Near East.

This great archdiocesan metropolis is technically outside the Egyptian Province and is not considered to be within the jurisdiction of the pope of Alexandria, but is one of the possessions of the Coptic Orthodox Church of Alexandria. It was created by Pope Cyril III (1235–1243) in the thirteenth century, which, at that time, had caused a dispute between the Coptic Orthodox Church of Alexandria and the Syriac Orthodox Church of Antioch. This was a very rare incident between the two sister churches as in general their relationship is one of the strongest between any two sister churches.

According to the Alexandrine tradition, the rank of metropolitan bishop is granted by the pope to the diocesan bishops under his jurisdiction on a personal status (In Personam) and not due to the size or importance of the bishop's eparchy; however, the rank of metropolitan archbishop is granted to those whose archdioceses have historical importance and had or have more than one suffragan diocese within their territorial jurisdictions.

The Coptic Orthodox Metropolitan Archbishop of Jerusalem is the only Coptic Orthodox hierarch who is consecrated as a metropolitan archbishop without being consecrated first as a bishop and later elevated to metropolitan archbishop, as is the norm in all episcopal consecration according to the tradition of the Church of Alexandria; it is done concurrently on the same occasion. This has been the case since Cyril III consecrated Metropolitan Archbishop Basilius as the first Coptic Orthodox Metropolitan Archbishop of Jerusalem and All the Near East.

Usually the chosen hieromonk is consecrated first as a diocesan bishop, then with time, he could be awarded the higher dignity of metropolitan bishop. Sometimes the nominated diocesan bishop is already an assistant bishop, auxiliary bishop or general bishop, in which case he is only enthroned as the bishop of that diocese.

Currently, and because the seniority of the members of the Holy Synod is decided according to the seniority of the consecretion/elevation date of the ecclesiastical ranks: First come the metropolitan archbishops and metropolitan bishops, followed by the diocesan bishops then the bishops exarchs of the throne, then the suffragan bishops, then the auxiliary bishops, then the general bishops and finally the chorbishops but also according to the date of consecration within each rank.

Accordingly, the most senior position after the pope is the oldest consecrated metropolitan archbishop, who was as of 2015 Metropolitan Pachomios, the metropolitan archbishop of the Holy Metropolis of Damanhur (Hermopolis Parva) and Beheira (Consecrated in 1990).

In spite of the ancient Alexandrine tradition, the most senior hierarch, after the senior hierarch of Pentapolis, is the hierarch of the Metropolis of Lycopolis, Hieracon and Apollonopolis Parva, which is Asyut; but since the great and ancient Titular Metropolis of Pentapolis in Cyrenaica, that comprises the Holy Suffragan Dioceses of Cyrene, Appollonia, Ptolemais, Berenice and Arsinoe, is currently a Titular title, incorporated within the jurisdiction of the metropolitan archbishop of the Holy Metropolis of Beheira Hermopolis Parva, Buto, Naucratis, Mariout Mareotis, Marsa Matruh Paraetonium, Apis; who is also the titular archbishop and patriarchal exarch of the Ancient and Holy Titular Archdiocese of Libya, comprising the titular suffragan dioceses of Livis, Marmarica, Darnis, Neapolis and Tripolitania; of the Ancient and Holy Exarchate of Africa in Tunisia, comprising the Titular and Holy Suffragan dioceses of Mauretania Tingitana and Mauretania Caesariensis and of the Ancient and Holy Titular Metropolis of Numedia in Algeria and Morocco that includes the Titular and Holy Suffragan dioceses of Leptis Parva and of Hadramentum. Accordingly, that honor goes to the Hierarch of the Metropolis of Lycopolis, Hieracon and Apollonopolis Parva apart from the fact of the current adoption of the seniority of the date of consecration of the later hierarch.

The most senior bishop in consecration will become the Locum tenens in case of the death of the pope and until the election of the new pope, and he will be the one who enthrones the newly elected pope along with all the hierarchs, who are members of the Holy Synod.

This seniority ranking system does not diminish the importance and the greatness of the Archdiocese of Jerusalem and All the Near East, since its inclusion under the jurisdiction of the Apostolic Church of Alexandria in early medieval times. The archiepiscopal status of this great metropolis is also granted due to the Holy Apostolic Throne that it represents, being the Apostolic and Patriarchal Throne of Jerusalem, although its metropolitan archbishop does not claim that title and is under the jurisdiction of the Holy Apostolic Throne of Alexandria.

== Gallery ==
A Gallery of the Coptic Holy Synod of Egypt (All Coptic Bishops) (external link)

A Gallery of the Members of the Holy Synod of the Coptic Orthodox Church of Alexandria In order of date of consecration in Arabic and English (external link)

== Chair and members of the Synod ==
=== Pontiff ===
Chairman of The Synod

1) Pope Tawadros II of Alexandria

- Pope and Lord Archbishop of the Great and Holy Metropolitan Archdiocese of Alexandria (Rhakotis), being:
  - The metropolitan of the Holy, Great and Ancient Metropolitan Archdiocese of Alexandria (Rhakotis), comprising:
    - The Great and Ancient Metropolis of Alexandria, which includes:
      - The Titular and Holy Suffragan Diocese of Canopus (Aboukir).
      - The Titular and Holy Suffragan Diocese of Menelaus.
      - The Titular and Holy Suffragan Diocese of Schedia.
      - The Holy Suffragan Diocese of El-Montazah District.
      - The Holy Suffragan Diocese of the Western District
  - The metropolitan of the Metropolitan Province of Greater Cairo comprising:
    - The Holy Archdiocese of Cairo (Augustamnica Ægypti), which includes:
      - The Holy Suffragan Diocese of East of the Railroad District in Cairo.
      - The Holy Suffragan Diocese of El Salam City (Irinipolis) in Cairo.
      - The Holy Suffragan Diocese of Central (Down Town) Cairo and of Heliopolis in Cairo.
      - The Holy Suffragan Diocese of Ezbet El Nakhl in Cairo.
      - The Holy Suffragan Diocese of Old Cairo (Babylon), Manial and Fum El Khalig in Cairo.
      - The Holy Suffragan Diocese of El-Mokattam Mountain in Cairo.
      - The Holy Suffragan Diocese of Northern & Southern Shoubra in Cairo.
      - The Holy Suffragan Diocese of Hadayek El-Kobba, El-Wailly & Mansheyat El-Sadr in Cairo.
      - The Holy Suffragan Diocese of El-Hagana & Almaza in Cairo.
      - The Holy Suffragan Diocese of Ain Shams & El-Matareya in Cairo.
  - The metropolitan archbishop of the Archdiocese of North America, which includes:
    - The Holy Suffragan Diocese of Alexandria and all Virginia, USA
- Elder and chief metropolitan archbishop of all the Egyptian Provinces.
- Primate of all Egypt, Pentapolis, Libya, Nubia and the Sudan.
- Patriarch of All Africa on the Throne of the Apostolic See of St. Mark the Evangelist, the Holy Apostle and Martyr.

=== Metropolitan archbishops of the throne and metropolitan bishops of the throne ===
2) Antonius, most senior and elder metropolitan archbishop of the Holy and Great City of Our Lord, Jerusalem (Holy Zion); Archbishop of the Holy and Ancient Archdiocese of Jerusalem, all Palestine and the Near East comprising:

- The Holy Suffragan Diocese of Philadelphia of Jordan.
- The Holy Suffragan Diocese of Lebanon and Greater Mesopotamia, comprising Syria, Iraq & Kuwait.

3) Wissa (Besa), metropolitan bishop of the Holy Metropolis of el-Balyana (Abydos), comprising:

- The Holy Suffragan Diocese of Berdis.
- The Holy Suffragan Diocese of Awlad Tookh and its jurisdictions.

4) Paphnutius, metropolitan bishop of the Holy Metropolis of Samalut and Taha El Aameda.

5) Benyamin (Benjamin), metropolitan bishop of the Holy Metropolis of Al Minufiyah (Prosopolis).

6) Tadros (Theodoros), metropolitan bishop of the Holy Metropolis of Port Said (Pelusium). Being also the titular bishop of:

- The Titular and Holy Suffragan Diocese of (Tahpanhes).
- The Titular and Holy Suffragan Diocese of (Phacusa).
- The Titular and Holy Suffragan Diocese of (Farama).

7) Serapion, metropolitan bishop of the Holy Metropolis of Los Angeles, all Southern California and Hawaii, USA. Being also the abbot of the Monastery of Saint Anthony the Great in Barstow, California, United States.

8) Paula (Paul), metropolitan bishop of the Holy Metropolis of Tanta.

9) Pissada, metropolitan bishop of the Holy Metropolis of Akhmim (Panopolis), Saqualta and the Holy Monasteries of Mount Akhmim in Upper Egypt.

10) Andrawis (Andrew), metropolitan bishop of the Holy Metropolis of Abutig, Sedfa and el Ghanayem.

11) Ashe’yia (Isaiah), metropolitan bishop of the Holy Metropolis of Tahta, Juhayna and Gabalein (Aphroditopolis & Hispis (Pathyris))

12) Markos (Mark), metropolitan bishop of the Holy Metropolis of Shubra el-Kheima.

13) Abram, metropolitan bishop of the Holy Metropolis of Faiyum. Being also the abbot of the Monastery of Archangel Gabriel in the Naqloun Mountain, Central Egypt.

14) Barsoum (Parsoma), metropolitan bishop of the Holy Metropolis of Dairut and Sanabou.

15) Demetrios, metropolitan bishop of the Holy Metropolis of Mallawi, comprising the following:

- The Holy Suffragan Diocese of Ansena (Antinoopolis).
- The Holy Suffragan Diocese of El Ashmunein (Hermopolis Magna).

Being also the abbot of the Monastery of Saint Fana, Upper Egypt.

16) Bakhoum (Pachomius), metropolitan bishop of the Holy Metropolis of Sohag (Athribis), comprising the following:

- The Holy Suffragan Diocese of el-Mansha (Ptolemais Hermiou).
- The Holy Suffragan Diocese of el-Maragha.

17) Thomas, metropolitan bishop of the Holy Metropolis of el-Qusiya (Qis) and Meir.

18) Daniel, metropolitan bishop of the Holy Metropolis of Maadi & El-Basateen,

19) Cheroubim (Cherubim), metropolitan bishop of the Holy Metropolis of Qena, comprising the Holy Suffragan Diocese of Qift (Coptos) and its jurisdictions

20) Pimen, metropolitan bishop of the Holy Metropolis of Naqada (Ombos), comprising the Holy Suffragan Diocese of Qus (Apollonopolis Parva).

21) Takla (Thekla), metropolitan bishop of the Holy Metropolis of Dishna, comprising the Holy Suffragan Diocese of Dendera (Tentyris) and its jurisdictions.

22) Maximos, metropolitan bishop of the Holy Metropolis of Banha (Leontopolis), comprising the Holy Suffragan Diocese of Quouwaysena (Athribis).

23) Youssef (Joseph), metropolitan bishop of the Holy Metropolis of Southern United States. Being also the abbot of the Monastery of the Most Holy Virgin Mary and Saint Moses the Strong in Corpus Christi, Texas, USA and the abbot of the Convent of the Most Holy Virgin Mary and Saint Demiana in Dawsonville, Georgia, USA.

24) Youannes (John), metropolitan bishop of the Holy Metropolis of Asyut (Lycopolis), comprising:

- The Titular and Holy Suffragan Diocese of (Hieracon).
- The Titular and Holy Suffragan Diocese of (Hierakonopolis).
- The Titular and Holy Suffragan Diocese of (Apollonopolis Parva),

and General Secretary of the Holy Synod.

25) Sarapamon (Serapis Amon), metropolitan bishop of the Holy Metropolis of Atbara, Omdurman and all the North of the Sudan; comprising the Holy Suffragan Diocese of Port Sudan. Being also titular bishop of:

- The Great and Ancient Titular Metropolis of Nubia, comprising:
- The Titular and Holy Suffragan Diocese of (Faras in Nobatia).
- The Titular and Holy Suffragan Diocese of (Dongola in Makouria).

26) Antony, metropolitan bishop of the Holy Metropolis of Ireland, Scotland and of all Northeast England, United Kingdom. Being also the abbot of the Monastery of St. Athanasius the Apostolic, United Kingdom.

27) Barnaba (Barnabas), metropolitan bishop of the Holy Metropolis of Torino and Southern Italy.

28) Damian, metropolitan bishop for the Holy Metropolis of Northern Germany, Höxter, Brenkhausen and affiliate jurisdictions. Being also the abbot of the Monastery of St. Mary & St. Maurice in Höxter, Germany

=== Diocesan bishops of the throne ===
29) Ammonios (Amon), diocesan bishop of the Holy Diocese of Luxor (Diospolis Magna), comprising the following:

- The Holy Suffragan Diocese of Esna (Latopolis).
- The Holy Suffragan Diocese of Armant (Hermonthis).

Being also titular bishop of:

- The Titular and Holy Suffragan Diocese of Coptos (Maximianopolis).
- The Titular and Holy Suffragan Diocese of (Eileithyiaspolis).

(Currently relieved from eparchial shepherding).

30) Missael, diocesan bishop of the Holy Diocese of Birmingham, all of the Midlands and its affiliated regions, United Kingdom.

31) Matthias, diocesan bishop of the Holy Diocese of El-Mahalla El-Kubra and Samanoud (Sebennytos). (Currently relieved from eparchial shepherding)

32) Suriel, former diocesan bishop of the Holy Diocese of Melbourne, Victoria (Australia), Tasmania, Australian Capital Territory, South Australia, Western Australia, New Zealand and patriarchal exarch of all Oceania. Being also the abbot of the Monastery of Saint Anthony the Great in Heathcote, Victoria (Australia).

(Currently relieved from eparchial shepherding and appointed as an Associate Professor of Religious Education at St Athanasius and St Cyril Theological School in New Jersey, USA)

33) Gabriel, diocesan bishop of the Holy Diocese of Beni Suef (Herakleopolis Magna) comprising the Holy Suffragan Diocese of El-Bahnasa (Oxyrhynchus). Being also titular bishop of:

- The Titular and Holy Suffragan Diocese of (Nilopolis).
- The Titular and Holy Suffragan Diocese of (Delas).

34) Georgios (George), diocesan bishop of the Holy Diocese of Matai (Acanthus) and its jurisdictions.

35) Stephanos (Stephen), diocesan bishop of the Holy Diocese of Beba, comprising the Holy Suffragan Diocese of Samasta and El Fashn.

36) Timotheos (Timothy), diocesan bishop of the Holy Diocese of Zaqaziq (Bubastis), comprising the Holy Suffragan Diocese of Menya Al Qamh (Sais). Being also titular bishop of the Titular and Holy Suffragan Dioceses of (Busiris).

37) Angaelos, diocesan bishop of the Holy Diocese of London. Being also the patriarchal exarch in the United Kingdom.

38) David, diocesan bishop of the Holy Diocese of New York and New England and all Northeastern states of the United States of America.

39) Gabriel, diocesan bishop of the Holy Diocese of Vienna and all Austria. Being also abbot of the Monastery of Saint Anthony the Great in Obersiebenbrunn.

40) Ilia (Elijah), diocesan bishop of the Holy Diocese of Khartoum and all the South of the Sudan; being also titular bishop of the Titular and Holy Suffragan Diocese of (Soba in Alodia).

41) Seraphim, diocesan bishop of the Holy Diocese of Ismailia (Heroonopolis) and titular bishop of the Titular and Holy Suffragan Diocese of (Pithom).

42) Apollo, diocesan bishop of the Holy Diocese of El-Tor (Raithu) and all South Sinai, comprising the Holy Suffragan Diocese of Sharm El Sheikh.

43) Aghathon, diocesan bishop of the Holy Diocese of Maghagha, comprising the Holy Suffragan Diocese of El Idwa.

44) Kosman (Cosmas), diocesan bishop of the Holy Diocese of El Arish (Rhinocorura) and all North Sinai, comprising the following:

- The Holy Suffragan Diocese of El Qantarah.
- The Holy Suffragan Diocese of Rafah (Rafia).

45) Daniel, diocesan bishop of the Holy Diocese of Sydney, New South Wales, Queensland, Northern Territory, Singapore, Thailand, Malaysia & Indonesia.

46) Macarios, diocesan bishop of the Holy Diocese of Minya & affiliate jurisdictions.

47) Apakir (Apa Cyrrhus), diocesan bishop of the Holy Diocese of Stockholm and of all Scandinavia.

48) Aghathon, diocesan bishop of the Holy Diocese of São Paulo and of all Brazil.

49) Youssef (Joseph), diocesan bishop of the Holy Diocese of Santa Cruz and of all Bolivia.

50) Theodosios, diocesan bishop of the Holy Diocese of Central Giza (Memphis) & affiliate jurisdictions.

51) Salib (Pistavros), diocesan bishop of the Holy Diocese of Meit Ghamr & affiliate jurisdictions.

52) Mercurios (Mercure), diocesan bishop of the Holy Diocese of Girga (Thinis) & affiliate jurisdictions.

53) Mina (Menas), diocesan bishop of the Holy Diocese of Mississauga, Vancouver & all Western Canada.

54) Samuel, diocesan bishop of the Holy Diocese of Tamouh, El-Badrashein, El Hawamdiah & affiliate jurisdictions.

55) Dometius, diocesan bishop of the Holy Diocese of October City, Ausim, Ashmoon & affiliate jurisdictions.

56) Youhanna (John), diocesan bishop of the Holy Diocese of Imbaba, El-Warraq & affiliate jurisdictions.

57) Maqar (Makarios), diocesan bishop of the Holy Diocese of Al Sharqiyah (Bubastis) and 10th of Ramadan City, being also the titular bishop of the Titular and Holy Suffragan Dioceses of (Thmuis), (Fakus) and of (Tanis).

58) Zosima (Zosimos), diocesan bishop of the Holy Diocese of Atfih (Aphroditopolis), El-Saff & affiliate jurisdictions.

59) Arsany (Arsanios), diocesan bishop of the Holy Diocese of Amsterdam and all the Netherlands & affiliate jurisdictions.

60) Pavlos (Paul), diocesan bishop of the Holy Diocese of Athens, all Greece and Cyprus

61) Luka (Luke), diocesan bishop of the Holy Diocese of Geneva (Switzerland) and Southern France

62) Karas (Cyrrhus), diocesan bishop of the Holy Diocese of Pennsylvania & its Affiliated Regions (Maryland, Delaware & West Virginia) (USA)

63) Markos (Mark), diocesan bishop of the Holy Diocese of Damietta (Thamiates) Being also the abbot of the Monastery of Saint Demiana.

64) Isshak (Isaac), diocesan bishop of the Holy Diocese of Tima (Antaeopolis).

65) Bemwa (Pamouh), diocesan bishop of the Holy Diocese of Suez (Clysma).

66) Ilarion (Hilarion), diocesan bishop of the Holy Diocese of Beheira & affiliate jurisdictions.

67) Marc (Mark), diocesan bishop of Paris and all Northern France

68) Peter, diocesan bishop of the Holy Diocese of North Carolina, South Carolina & Kentucky (USA)

69) Saraphim, diocesan bishop of the Holy Diocese of Ohio, Michigan & Indiana (USA)

70) Antonio, diocesan bishop of the Holy Diocese of Milan, Northern Italy. Being also the abbot of the Monastery of Saint Shenouda the Archimandrite in Milan

71) Giovanni, diocesan bishop of the Holy Diocese of Central Europe (Hungary, Czech Republic, Poland, Romania & Slovenia)

72) Arsanius, diocesan bishop of the Holy Diocese of El Wady El-Gedid (New Valley).

73) Mikhail, diocesan bishop of the Holy Diocese of Helwan and Al Maasara (Tura)

74) Theophilus, diocesan bishop of the Holy Diocese of Manfalut.

75) Ilarion (Hilarion), diocesan bishop of the Holy Diocese of Hurghada, Kosseir, & all the Red Sea

76) Boules (Paul), diocesan bishop of the Holy Diocese of Ottawa, Montreal & Eastern Canada, Canada.

77) Philopateer, diocesan bishop of the Holy Diocese of Abu Qurqas

78) Fam, diocesan bishop of the Holy Diocese of East Minya

79) Joseph, diocesan bishop of the Holy Diocese of Namibia, Botswana, Zimbabwe & Malawi.

80) Axios, diocesan bishop of the Holy Diocese of Mansoura (Leontopolis) and titular bishop of the Titular and Holy Suffragan Diocese of (Mendes). Being also abbot of the Monastery of Saint George at Meit Demsis, Lower Egypt.

81) Bishoy (Pishoy), diocesan bishop of the Holy Diocese of Aswan & affiliate jurisdictions.

82) Anianos, diocesan bishop of the Holy Diocese of Beni Mazar & affiliate jurisdictions.

83) Nofer, diocesan bishop of the Holy Diocese of Shebin El Quanater, Toukh and El Khanka

84) Picenti (Pisentios), diocesan bishop of the Holy Diocese of Abnub and el Fateh & New Assiut & affiliate jurisdictions. Being also the abbot of the Monastery of St. Mina in Abnub.

85) Bedaba, diocesan bishop of the Holy Diocese of Nag Hammâdi (Khenoboskion) and Abu Tesht.

86) Dioscoros, diocesan bishop of the Holy Diocese of Southern Germany and abbot of the Monastery of Saint Anthony the Great in Kroeffelbach, Germany

87) Karas, diocesan bishop of the Holy Diocese of Matrouh & Pentapolis.

88) Boctor, diocesan bishop of the Holy Diocese of Deir Mawas and Delga.

89) Mina, diocesan bishop of the Holy Diocese of Borg El-Arab & El-Amreya.

=== Suffragan bishops of the throne ===
90) Michael, suffragan bishop of the Holy Suffragan Diocese of Ashburn, Virginia parts of Richmond, Virginia], USA; suffragan to the archdiocese of North America, which is currently under patriarchal jurisdiction.

=== Auxiliary bishops of the throne ===
91) Abraham, auxiliary bishop for the Holy Metropolis of Los Angeles, auxiliary to Metropolitan Serapion.

92) Kyrillos, auxiliary bishop for the Holy Metropolis of Los Angeles, auxiliary to Metropolitan Serapion.

93) Basil, auxiliary bishop for the Holy Diocese of Southern United States, auxiliary to Metropolitan Youssef.

94) Gregory, auxiliary bishop for the Holy Diocese of Southern United States, auxiliary to Metropolitan Youssef.

95) Ignatius, auxiliary bishop for the Holy Metropolis of Qena & Qift, auxiliary to Metropolitan Cheroubim

=== Assistant bishops of suffragan patriarchal dioceses of the throne ===
96) Raphael, assistant bishop for the patriarchal Suffragan Holy Diocese of Central Cairo (Downtown) in the Holy Archdiocese of Cairo (Arcadia Ægypti), assistant to the pope.

97) Maximos, assistant bishop for the patriarchal Suffragan Holy Diocese of Dar El Salam (Irinipolis) in the Holy Archdiocese of Cairo (Arcadia Ægypti), assistant to the pope.

98) Martyros, assistant bishop for the patriarchal Suffragan Holy Diocese of East of the Railroad Region in the Holy Archdiocese of Cairo (Arcadia Ægypti), assistant to the pope.

99) Youlyous (Julius), assistant bishop for the patriarchal Suffragan Holy Diocese of Old Cairo (Babylon), Manial and Fum El Khalig in the Holy Archdiocese of Cairo (Arcadia Ægypti), assistant to the pope and administrator of the Bishopric of Social Services

100) Abanoub (Abba Noub), assistant bishop for the patriarchal Suffragan Holy Diocese of Mokattam in the Holy Archdiocese of Cairo (Arcadia Ægypti), assistant to the pope.

101) Makary (Makarios), assistant bishop for the patriarchal Suffragan Holy Diocese of Southern Shoubra in the Holy Archdiocese of Cairo (Arcadia Ægypti), assistant to the pope.

102) Angelos, assistant bishop for the patriarchal Suffragan Holy Diocese of Northern Shoubra in the Holy Archdiocese of Cairo (Arcadia Ægypti), assistant to the pope.

103) Pavly (Paul), assistant bishop for the patriarchal Suffragan Holy Diocese of El-Montazah District in the Holy Archdiocese of Alexandria (Rhakotis), assistant to the pope.

104) Klemandos (Clement), assistant bishop for the patriarchal Suffragan Holy Diocese of El-Hagana & Almaza in the Holy Archdiocese of Cairo (Arcadia Ægypti), assistant to the pope.

105) Hermina (Hermion), assistant bishop for the patriarchal Suffragan Holy Diocese of the Central & Eastern Districts in the Holy Archdiocese of Alexandria (Rhakotis), assistant to the pope.

106) Sidaros, assistant bishop of the patriarchal Suffragan Holy Diocese of Ezbet El Nakhl & El-Marg in the Holy Archdiocese of Cairo (Arcadia Ægypti), assistant to the pope

107) Oulogious, assistant bishop of the patriarchal Suffragan Holy Diocese of Ain Shams, Matariyeh & Helmiyet El-Zeitoun in the Holy Archdiocese of Cairo (Arcadia Ægypti), assistant to the pope

108) Athanasius, assistant bishop of the patriarchal Suffragan Holy Diocese of Hadayek El-Kobba, El-Wailly & Mansheyat El-Sadr in the Holy Archdiocese of Cairo (Arcadia Ægypti), assistant to the pope

=== Patriarchal exarchs and vicars of the throne ===
109) Macarios, patriarchal exarch of the Eritrean Congregation in the USA. Member of the Eritrean Holy Synod.

110) Pavlos (Paul), patriarchal exarch, in the capacity of a Missionary Bishop for the Exarchate of Evangelism & Mission in East and Central Africa.

111) Youssab (Joseph), patriarchal vicar for the Holy Diocese of Luxor (Diospolis Magna), assistant to the pope.

112) Youakim (Joachim), patriarchal vicar for the Holy Diocese of Esna (Latopolis) and Armant (Hermonthis), assistant to the pope.

113) Reweis, patriarchal exarch, in the capacity of a Missionary Bishop for the churches in Southeast Asia, and administrator of the Diocese of Melbourne & affiliated regions, assistant to the pope.

114) Ignatius, patriarchal vicar for the Holy Diocese of El-Mahalla El-Kubra and Samanoud, assistant to the pope.

115) Archilidis, patriarchal exarch in Toronto, Canada for the Archdiocese of North America.

116) Gabriel, patriarchal exarch in Cedar Grove, New Jersey for the Archdiocese of North America.

=== Bishop abbots of the Holy and Sacred Monasteries of the throne ===
117) Mattaos (Matthew), bishop and abbot of the Monastery of the Most Holy Virgin Mary, known as the Syrian Monastery, in Scetes, Lower Egypt.

118) Basilios (Basil), bishop and abbot of the Monastery of Saint Samuel the Confessor, in El Qualamon Mountain, Upper Egypt.

119) Yustos (Justus), bishop and abbot of the Monastery of Saint Anthony the Great, in the Eastern Desert.

120) Isithoros (Isidore), bishop and abbot of the Monastery of the Most Holy Virgin Mary, known as the Paromeos (Roman) Monastery, in Scetes, Lower Egypt.

121) Kyrillos (Cyril), bishop and abbot of the Monastery of Saint Mina, in the Desert of Mariut (Mareotis), Lower Egypt.

122) Mina (Menas), bishop and abbot of the Monastery of Saint George in El Khatatba, Central Egypt.

123) Daniel, bishop and abbot of the Monastery of Saint Paul the Anchorite, in the Eastern Desert.

124) Daniel, bishop and abbot of the Monastery of St. Shenouda the Archimandrite, in Sydney, New South Wales, Australia.

125) Oulogios (Evlogios), bishop and abbot of the Monastery of Saint Shenouda the Archimandrite in Sohag, Upper Egypt.

126) Pigol, bishop and abbot of the Monastery of the Most Holy Virgin Mary, known as Al Muharraq Monastery, Upper Egypt

127) Saweros (Severus), bishop and abbot of the Monasteries of St Thomas & Mar Boctor in El-Khatatba, Central Egypt.

128) Mettaous, bishop and abbot of the Monastery of St. Mary in Akhmim, Upper Egypt

129) Aghapius, bishop and abbot of the Monastery of Saint Pishoy in Scetes, Lower Egypt.

130) Arsanious, bishop and abbot of the Monastery of Saint Pachomius the Cenobite in Edfu, Upper Egypt.

131) Dioscoros, bishop and abbot of the Monastery of Saint John the Short - Alamein

132) Thomas, bishop and abbot of the Monastery of St Mary & Archangel Michael in El Bahnasa, Upper Egypt.

133) Ikladios, bishop and abbot of the Monastery of St Pakhomios (El-shayeb) in Luxor, Upper Egypt.

134) Pakhomius, bishop and abbot of the Monastery of St Macarius of Alexandria in Mount Al-Qalali, Beheira Governorate

=== General bishops administrators of the bishoprics of the throne ===
135) Moussa (Moses), general bishop and administrator for the Bishopric of Youth Affairs.

136) Dioscoros, general bishop and administrator of the Patriarchal Print Shop.

137) Botros (Peter), general bishop for the Patriarchal Media (Head of Aghapy TV Channel).

138) Armiah (Jeremiah), general bishop and chief of the Coptic Orthodox Cultural Center.

=== Patriarchal vicar in Alexandria ===
139) Hegumen Abraam Emil, Grand Economos and patriarchal vicar in Alexandria.

=== Patriarchal vicar in Cairo ===
140) Hegumen Sergios Sergios, administrative patriarchal vicar in Cairo.

=== Vacant metropolis/diocese/abbey ===
1) (Vacant), bishop and abbot of the Monastery of Saint George in El Rozaiquat, Central Egypt.

2) (Vacant), patriarchal exarch of the Eritrean Congregation in the UK and Member of the Eritrean Holy Synod. (Vacant after the departure of Bishop Markos on April 29, 2017)

3) (Vacant), bishop and abbot of the Monastery of Saint Macarius the Great in Scetes, Lower Egypt. (Vacant after the martyrdom of Bishop Epiphanios on July 29, 2018)

4) (Vacant), metropolitan bishop of the Holy Metropolis of Marseille and Primate of the Holy Metropolis of Toulon and of all France, that is The French Coptic Orthodox Church. (Vacant after the departure of Metropolitan Athanasius on October 22, 2023)

5) (Vacant), metropolitan bishop of the Holy Metropolis of South Africa and its jurisdictions (Vacant after the departure of Metropolitan Antonious Markos on October 25, 2025)

== Definition of hierarchical titles according to the Alexandrine Tradition ==
=== Pope and Patriarch of Alexandria ===
Pontiff and Supreme Hierarch of the Holy Orthodox & Apostolic Throne of Alexandria. He is considered First among equals (primus inter pares) on his Apostolic Throne. He presides over the Holy Synod of the Coptic Orthodox Patriarchate of Alexandria and over all Patriarchal Institutions. He is also the Head of the Catechetical School of Alexandria.

He consecrates, crowns and enthrones patriarchs and catholicoi (within his Dominion/Jurisdiction in Africa). He consecrates and crowns archbishops, metropolitans and Bishops, and delegates several metropolitans and Bishops to enthrone them. He ordains archpriests, priests, archdeacons, deacons, sub-deacons, all minor orders, all ranks of monastics, elevates Bishops to the metropolitan, the archiepiscopal or the patriarchal dignity. He consecrates the Holy Myron. He also bestows the honor of the Great Schema upon the monastics who have achieved the highest degree of asceticism in monastic life or upon those who are to be ordained to the episcopal rank.

He anoints, crowns and enthrones Orthodox Emperors and Empresses, Orthodox Kings and Queens. He also consecrates all Church buildings, altars, baptisteries, holy vessels and vestments. He has the First and the Highest Rank of the Episcopal Dignity of the Holy Apostolic Throne of Alexandria. He is the Primate of the second highest Apostolic Throne, in accordance with the Canon Laws of the Ecumenical Council of Nicea (325 AD), after Imperial Rome. The Throne of Alexandria later became third in rank, after the Imperial Cities of Rome and Constantinople, New Rome, in accordance with the Canon Laws of the Ecumenical Council of Constantinople (381AD).

=== Metropolitan archbishops and metropolitan bishops ===
Administrative title of the episcopal rank for a large diocese or eparchy, bestowed upon a diocesan bishop by the patriarch, in recognition for his long service in his diocese/eparchy. It can also be granted due to the extended size of a diocese or an eparchy (by becoming an archdiocese or an archeparchy,) thus forming or is considered as an ecclesiastical province, which requires its prelate to be elevated to the metropolitan /archiepiscopal dignity.

The higher title of metropolitan bishop/metropolitan archbishop is granted to the bishop of the metropolis. He may oversee several suffragan bishops (to each his own diocese) within his province, auxiliary bishops (assistant to the hierarch) and/or chori-episcopoi, under his jurisdiction.

The title of metropolitan archbishop is granted to the hierarch of the metropolis that has a historical dignity within the throne, and whose bishop ought to have the honorary dignity of a metropolitan archbishop, like metropolitan archbishop of the Archdiocese of Jerusalem, All Palestine and Philadelphia of Jordan and patriarchal exarch of all the Near East and the metropolitan archbishop and patriarchal exarch of the Ancient Archdiocese of Pentapolis in (Cyrenaica), comprising the suffragan dioceses of: (Cyrene), (Appollonia),(Ptolemais), (Berenice) and (Arsinoe), who is also the metropolitan archbishop and patriarchal exarch of the Ancient Archdiocese of Libya, comprising the suffragan dioceses of: (Livis, Marmarica, Darnis and Tripolitania).

He is called metropolitan in his own diocesan city, the metropolis and is called archbishop in all the other suffragan dioceses, whose suffragan bishops are under his jurisdiction. Whereas, the metropolitan bishop is called metropolitan in his own Diocesan City with its jurisdictions, which as a whole is considered a metropolis, according to the jurisdictional subdivision of the Church, and he may have assistant bishops or auxiliary bishops under his jurisdiction, but does not have suffragan dioceses, headed by suffragan bishops, under his jurisdiction.

He assists the patriarch and other hierarchs in consecrating, crowning and enthroning other patriarchs, catholicoi, archbishops, metropolitans and Bishops. He ordains archpriests, priests, archdeacons, deacons, sub-deacons and all minor orders to serve the parishes in his diocese or eparchy. He bestows the honor of the Great Schema upon the monastics who have achieved the highest degree of monastic life or upon those who are to be ordained to the episcopal rank and ordain novices to the monastic rank for the monasteries under his jurisdiction. He assists the patriarch in consecrating the Holy Myron. He also consecrates all Church buildings, altars, baptisteries and holy vessels and vestments in his diocese or eparchy.

He exercises the same authority in his metropolis and its jurisdiction as the patriarch on his throne. He can also be the abbot of a monastery, if assigned by the patriarch. In the case of the departure of the patriarch, the senior metropolitan in ordination, acts as Locum Tenens of the throne, until the election of the new patriarch, whom he will enthrone, along with the entire body of the hierarchy of the throne. During that time, no ordination of new hierarchs, no consecration of the Holy Myron, no new patriarchal decrees or alteration of previous patriarchal or Holy Synod decrees can be made. He is second in rank in the episcopal dignity.

=== Diocesan or eparchial bishop ===
Hierarch chosen to oversee a diocese or an eparchy, whether this diocese or eparchy is a subdivision of the patriarchate or a subdivision of a greater province, ruled by a metropolitan archbishop (which, in this case these are called suffragan bishops.) He is the shepherd of his flock. He has the right to consecrate parishes, altars, baptisteries and all ecclesiastical foundations. He assists the patriarch and other hierarchs in consecrating, crowning and enthroning other patriarchs, catholicoi, archbishops, metropolitans and Bishops. He ordains archpriests, priests, archdeacons, deacons, sub-deacons and all minor orders to serve the parishes of his diocese or eparchy.

He bestows the honor of the Great Schema upon the monastics who have achieved the highest degree of monastic life or upon those who are to be consecrated to the episcopal rank and ordain novices to the monastic rank for the monasteries under his jurisdiction. He assists the patriarch in consecrating the Holy Myron. He also consecrates, within his diocese or eparchy, all Church buildings, altars, baptisteries, holy vessels and vestments.

He exercises the same authority in his diocese as the patriarch on his Throne. He can also be the abbot of a monastery, if assigned by the patriarch. He is third in rank in the episcopal dignity.

=== General bishop/exarch of the throne ===
Hierarch who does not have a jurisdiction over a particular diocese and who is given a temporary patriarchal assignment to shepherd or supervise either a particular district/portion of the patriarchal diocese or on "at large" designation as a delegate assistant to the hierarch. He can also be serving within the patriarchal diocese/Jurisdiction, shepherding multiple congregations. He can also supervise an area or a region that has not yet been designated or established as a diocese, thus acting as an exarch of the throne. In this case, he is considered as a patriarchal vicar if assigned within Egypt (the Mother Church) or as a patriarchal exarch of the throne if assigned outside Egypt for certain duration.

He also can be the administrator of a bishopric (i.e. the Youth, Social & Ecumenical Services, Scientific Research & Higher Coptic Studies Bishoprics), which are patriarchal organizations headed by a general bishop concerned with social, educational and spiritual care of the members of the patriarchate at large or of a Patriarchal Institution (the Patriarchal Print Shop, or the Patriarchal Secretariat). In this capacity, he is the administrator of this particular bishopric or Patriarchal Institution. He assists the patriarch and other hierarchs in consecrating, crowning and enthroning other patriarchs, catholicoi, archbishops, metropolitans and bishops. He ordains archpriests, priests, archdeacons, deacons, sub-deacons and all minor orders to serve the parishes with patriarchal permission within the province, which are directly under the patriarchal jurisdiction, whether within Egypt or outside Egypt, when delegated.

He assists the patriarch in consecrating the Holy Myron. He also consecrates all Church buildings, altars, baptisteries and holy vessels and vestments by patriarchal delegation. He reports directly to the patriarch. He has the same episcopal authority and dignity as a regular bishop.

He can also be the abbot of a monastery, if assigned by the patriarch, and in this case he is given the title of bishop abbot, and ceases to be a general bishop or exarch of the throne. The title of general bishop is not in conformity with the Holy and Apostolic Canon Laws of the Orthodox Church. On the other hand, an exarch was and still is a permissible form of patriarchal delegation or representation.

=== Auxiliary bishop/assistant bishop/suffragan bishop ===
A suffragan hierarch who has been delegated by the patriarch or a metropolitan archbishop to serve a district or part of the patriarchal or metropolitan archdiocese or jurisdiction, or a suffragan diocese to the metropolitan archdiocese; if suffragan diocese is in question based on a quasi-permanent, occasional or as a temporal helper, then it is within patriarchal diocesan jurisdiction, although in this case, he would be called assistant bishop. He shepherds the congregation of that particular diocese (if suffragan) or district (if within the patriarchal diocese), reporting directly to the metropolitan archbishop or the pope of Alexandria respectively.

He can also be assigned as an assistant by the pope of Alexandria to help a metropolitan bishop in his metropolitanate, which is not divided into smaller subdivisions of suffragan dioceses, and based upon the metropolitan bishop's or the metropolitan archbishop's request, if the latter requires an assistant. In this case, he is called an assistant bishop, he reports to the diocesan hierarch, i.e. the metropolitan bishop or the metropolitan archbishop.

He does not, however, inherit (take over) the metropolis after the departure of the metropolitan bishop or the metropolitan archbishop. In the case that this bishop is chosen as a "coadjutor bishop" to a particular metropolis/archdiocese or a suffragan diocese of the metropolis in the capacity of coadjutor bishop, in assistance to the metropolitan bishop or the metropolitan archbishop, thus being second in command; then he has the right of succession when the latter reposes in the Lord. However, this form of governance is not favored and seldom applied nowadays in the Alexandrine tradition.

If the metropolitan bishop or the metropolitan archbishop of a large metropolis or archdiocese is in need of one or more general helpers in all kinds of services and to delegate to serve or shepherd all over the jurisdiction of the aforementioned hierarch, then the chosen bishop/s is/are called auxiliary bishop/s to the hierarch in these capacities.

The idea of having more than one bishop shepherding a particular diocese/metropolitanate/archdiocese is against the Canon Laws of the Church. This, however has been, recently, adapted and ratified by local synodical decrees, on the basis that the auxiliary bishop is assigned to a metropolitan bishop or the metropolitan archbishop within his province, for a specific district or region (being too small to be considered as a suffragan diocese), as a means for better serving the congregation of a large diocese. In this case, the large diocese is considered as a province. These auxiliary bishops are considered to the metropolitan bishop or the metropolitan archbishop of the province as the bishops of the patriarchate are to the patriarch within his patriarchate. If the metropolis or the archdiocese has one or more suffragan diocese within its jurisdiction, then the appointment of suffragan bishops is a canonically accepted measure to extend the proper episcopal shepherding to this/these suffragan diocese(s).

These appointments are reasoned in the following cases:

- The metropolitan bishop or the metropolitan archbishop, being the Hierarch of a large region or jurisdiction, which includes many cities and their suburbs, that could be divided into more than one diocese within the metropolis and since he reserves the right to be the diocesan bishop, meaning the (Shepherd) of the main city (the metropolis) of his archeparchial province, he appoints suffragan bishops for these dioceses.
- Due to the age or physical health of the metropolitan bishop or the metropolitan archbishop, an auxiliary bishop is then appointed to serve a part of the metropolis /archdiocese or an assistant bishop is appointed as a general assistant to the ruling hierarch.

The auxiliary bishop/suffragan bishop/assistant bishop assists the patriarch and other hierarchs in consecrating, crowning and enthroning other patriarchs, catholicoi, archbishops, metropolitans and bishops. He ordains archpriests, priests, archdeacons, deacons, sub-deacons and all minor orders to serve the parishes of his district, diocese or eparchy. He assists the patriarch, and all the metropolitans and all the bishops in consecrating the Holy Myron. He also consecrates all Church buildings, altars, baptisteries, holy vessels and vestments by patriarchal, archiepiscopal or metropolitan delegation. He has the same episcopal authority and dignity as a regular bishop.

=== Titular bishop ===
A hierarch, who is given the title for a defunct diocese, in commemoration of its historical status. In the Coptic Orthodox Patriarchate of Alexandria, it has been the custom to give this title to a metropolitan bishop or a metropolitan archbishop or a bishop who already shepherds an active archdiocese or diocese. It would be considered a part of his ecclesiastical jurisdiction; rather than having a metropolitan bishop or a metropolitan archbishop or a bishop overseeing a defunct diocese, with no real congregation of its own (i.e. Pentapolis and Nubia).

He assists the patriarch and other hierarchs in consecrating, crowning and enthroning other patriarchs, catholicoi, archbishops, metropolitans and bishops. He ordains archpriests, priests, archdeacons, deacons, sub-deacons and all minor orders to serve the parishes of his diocese or eparchy. (Being already a diocesan metropolitan or bishop as mentioned above).

He has the same episcopal authority and dignity as any regular bishop or metropolitan (since in this case, he is in fact a diocesan bishop/metropolitan). He can also be the abbot of a monastery, if assigned by the patriarch, and in this case, he can keep his title of titular bishop, side by side with his title of bishop abbot.

=== Chorbishop (Chori-Episcopus) ===
An episcopal rank given for a hierarch of a small town or village, under the jurisdiction of a metropolitan bishop, a metropolitan archbishop or a bishop. He has the same ecclesiastical authority as that of the other hierarchs. The exception is that he is to ordain priests or deacons and all minor orders, to consecrate holy vessels, altars, baptisteries or churches only in his village or town and only with the authorization of the patriarch, if assigned within the patriarchal diocese, or that of a metropolitan bishop, a metropolitan archbishop or a bishop of the metropolis/diocese, in which his town or village is.

This special patriarchal, metropolitan or episcopal permission is essential for the above-mentioned ordinations and consecrations. He cannot do the above-mentioned consecration outside his assigned jurisdiction, or even within the main diocesan cities of the province he serves in.

He assists the patriarch and other hierarchs in consecrating, crowning and enthroning other patriarchs, catholicoi, archbishops, metropolitans and bishops by episcopal permission of the ruling hierarch of the provincial diocese or eparchy, in which he is serving.

He also has no jurisdiction over the priests or archpriests of the major or capital cities within the province where his town or village is located. He has the same episcopal authority and dignity as the diocesan bishop, including the above-mentioned authorities with permission. He can also be the abbot of a monastery, if assigned by the patriarch.

== See also ==
- Coptic Orthodox Church of Alexandria
- General Congregation Council
- Christianity in Africa
- The French Coptic Orthodox Church
- Copts
- Coptic alphabet
- Coptic calendar
- Coptic iconography
- Coptic language
- Coptic music
- Coptic abstinence
- Coptic Orphans
- Coptic Catholic Church
- Coptic Orthodox Church in Australia
- Coptic Orthodox Church in Britain and Ireland
- Coptic Orthodox Church in Canada
- Coptic Orthodox Church in Europe
- Coptic Orthodox Church in the United States
- Coptic Orthodox Church in South America
- Coptic Orthodox Diocese of Los Angeles
- Coptic Orthodox Diocese of the Southern United States
- The Coptic Orthodox Diocese of Port Said
- Coptic Church in Wales
- Eastern Orthodoxy
- Greek Orthodox Church of Alexandria
- Egypt
- List of Coptic Orthodox Popes of Alexandria
- Oriental Orthodoxy
- Patriarch of Alexandria
- Pope Shenouda III of Alexandria
- Pope of the Coptic Orthodox Church of Alexandria
