= Mikhail of Asyut =

Coptic Metropolitan

His Eminence Mikhail
- Most Senior and Elder Metropolitan Archbishop of the Metropolis of Asyut
- Native name: نيافة الأنبا ميخائيل مطران أسيوط
- Church: Coptic Orthodox Church of Alexandria
- Metropolis: Holy and Ancient Metropolis of Asyut (Lycopolis), comprising: The Titular and Holy Suffragan Diocese of (Hieracon).; The Titular and Holy Suffragan Diocese of (Hierakonopolis).; The Titular and Holy Suffragan Diocese of (Apollonopolis Parva).
- Diocese: Assiut
- Appointed: 25 August 1946
- Previous post: Abbot of the Monastery of Saint Macarius the Great

Orders
- Ordination: 17 November 1939
- Rank: Metropolitan

Personal details
- Born: Matias hanna 4 July 1921 Al-Rahmaniya, Egypt (in the district of Nag Hammadi within the Qena Governorate)
- Died: 23 November 2014 (aged 93) Asyut - Egypt
- Denomination: Coptic Orthodox
- Residence: Archangel Michael Coptic Orthodox Cathedral Asyut

Mikhail of Asyut (Arabic: نيافة الأنبا ميخائيل مطران أسيوط) (4 July 1921 – 23 November 2014), was the elder metropolitan of the Holy Metropolis of Asyut (Lycopolis), (Hieracon, (Hierakonopolis) and (Apollonopolis Parva) of the Coptic Orthodox Church of Alexandria and was the abbot of the Monastery of Saint Macarius the Great, in Scetes, Lower Egypt until early 2009, when he decided to resign this responsibility due to his failing health and also due to the demise of Matta El-Meskeen, the Chief Hegumen in-charge of the Monastery of Saint Macarius the Great in 2008.

Mikhail was born "Matyas Hanna" in 1921, in the poor family of Egyptian Coptic Christians in the village of "Al-Rahmaniya", in the district of "Nag Hammadi" in "Qena" Governorate. He became a monk of the Monastery of St. Macarius the Great on 19 February 1939, taking the name Matyas al-Maqari. He was ordained priest on 17 November 1939. He studied in the Monastic School of Helwan from 1942–1944.

He served as Coptic Orthodox Metropolitan of Asyut since 1946. His episcopal ordination took place on 25 August 1946. For many years, he was the most senior Oriental Orthodox bishop in the date of episcopal ordination in the world.

He died on 23 November 2014 in Asyut, Egypt.

== See also ==
- List of Copts
- The Holy Synod of the Coptic Orthodox Church

== Sources ==
- https://web.archive.org/web/20080724094819/http://www.theholysynod.copticpope.org/m001.htm
- Metropolitan Mikhail of Asyut (1920-2014) | Archive of Contemporary Coptic Orthodox Theology (St Cyril's Coptic Orthodox Theological College)
- The Holy Synod (in Arabic and English)
- http://www.anbawissa.org/vb/showthread.php?t=11930 (in Arabic)
- http://www.hierarchy.religare.ru/h-aincvost-monofiz.html (in Russian)
