= Gabal El Haridi =

- Location in Egypt
- Coordinates: 26°46′N 31°34′E
- Country: Egypt
- Governorate: Sohag
- Time zone: UTC+2 (EST)
  - Summer (DST): +3

Gabal El Haridi is an archaeological site in Egypt approximately 350 kilometers south of Cairo within Sakulta, in Sohag Governorate in Upper Egypt. The site is located south of Qaw El Kebir (Tjebu), in an area between the towns of El Nawawra and El Gelawiya. The site is very important historically because of the Coptic presence throughout the site. This is because this was the beginning of the use of isolated monasteries that brought the hermits together in a settled community. Significant unknown writings from the Ptolemaic period were found and recorded. The extensive quarrying throughout time suggests that Gabal El Haridi contained one of the more important sources of stone under the Ptolemies and Ramses III. The looting and destruction of the site has caused the site archaeologists great difficulty in determining specific details such as dates and owners of tombs. The details that have been obtained have allowed for a greater understanding of the changes in use of the site throughout its occupation for three thousand years.

== Region ==
Gabal El Haridi is approximately 350 kilometers south of Cairo within Sakulta, in Sohag province in Upper Egypt. This region is mountainous with large vertical limestone cliffs. The stratum also consists of clay, flint and pebbles in the Ma’aza limestone plateau. The main feature of the site is a vast, curved limestone promontory near the east bank of the Nile River. As the site continues south, the cliff moves closer to the Nile River. North of the site is a large desert entitled the Plain of Nauwarra. Near the bottom of the gebel, the modern cutting of the El Isawiya Canal bisects the region. Gabal El Hariri's largest village, El Khazindariya lies south of the ‘Mountain of Ramesses’. An additional village, Nazlet El Haridi was discovered furthers south of the previously mentioned village. A wadi near Nazlet El Haridi contains the tomb of the Sheikh el-Haridi and his son Hassan from the Old Kingdom.

== Survey and history ==
The preliminary surveys of Gabal El Haridi revealed significant archaeological material from the Sixth Dynasty of the Old Kingdom to the late Roman Empire and Coptic period. The archaeological remains that were discovered illustrate several types of continued occupation at the site. A large stone quarry, rock-cut tombs used as necropolis, and an enclosed mud-brick settlement were all found within the boundaries.

The earliest mention of the site is by Richard Pococke in 1763. The Napoleontic expedition (1798) mentions the site, and Robert Hay conducted important epigraphic work 1832-3. John Gardiner Wilkinson followed in 1855, and recorded the old kingdom tombs. Nestor L'Hôte and Bonomi traveled the Gebel el-Haridi region during the 19th century. These men recorded what they saw as they travelled through the region, such as Ptolemaic quarries, Christian brick ruins, tombs, and mutilated statues.

Wilhelm Spiegelberg traveled to the site in 1913 and recorded inscriptions in the Ptolemaic quarry mentioning Ptolemy XII Auletes. In Porter and Moss the king is referred to as Ptolemy Neos Dionysos. The King appears before Min, Harsiese, Isis, a form of Horus (called Ka'zana) and the lion-headed Repyt (Tryphis).

Labib Habachi recorded a large inscription of Ramesses III which was found at Gabal El Haridi.

== EES Excavations and results ==
=== First survey (1991–92) ===
The first systematic excavation survey began on 14 December 1991 and concluded on 4 January 1992. The Egypt Exploration Society supported the British mission that conducted the three surveys. The first survey conducted focused on the quarries at El Khazindariya, the Ptolemaic Quarries, the tombs of the Sheikh El Haridi, and the mud-brick area near the slope of Abu El Nasr. Three large quarries were located at El Khazindariya. The significance of these quarries comes from the large rock inscription of Ramesses III and surface pottery. A rock inscription of Ramesses III, who was the second pharaoh during the twentieth dynasty, implies that quarrying was carried out under his rule in this particular site. The shapes of these quarries were irregularly fan shaped, including many faceted niches. The Ptolemaic Quarries are located at the top of Abu El Nasr. These quarries were dated to the Ptolemaic period from royal inscriptions found inside. The major significance of these quarries is the large representation of Ptah and Thoth on each side of the north entrance walls facing outwards. The Ptah figure has great importance because of the bulbous crown that was reminiscent of the white crown. In another quarry nearby an inscription of the goddess Hathor was recorded wearing the crown of Upper and Lower Egypt. The difference in the crowns worn by the deities indicates the varying time period occupations in the site. Hieroglyphic text was present above Horus and Hathor; unfortunately, it was mutilated, along with the cartouches that were completely destroyed. The destruction of the hieroglyphs and the cartouches has caused the modern world to lose the knowledge of who was interned in the nearby tombs, and additional information about the events during that time period in Ancient Egypt history.

Tombs found at the site revealed that the site was being used during the Old Kingdom. Tomb 1 contains text stating that the owner held a temple official position. The style of the relief figure of a nobleman and the accompanied text allowed the archaeologists to date the tomb to the Sixth Dynasty. Tomb 2 may have been re-used for occupation or reburial. This has been postulated because of the mud plaster on several of the quarried walls. The most unusual feature of Tomb 2 is the stars and yellow figure that were used to decorate the ceilings. The yellow figure in the center of the stars has not been positively identified. One idea is that is depicts a fish; if this is true, then it suggests that the ceiling might be astronomical. The date of this tomb is unknown, it could be from the Old, Middle or New Kingdom; but because of its proximity to Tomb 1, an Old Kingdom date is favored. The third tomb contains a fragmentary representation of a human figure, painted directly onto the rock face. Tomb 4 and 5 both contain burial debris including human bone and textiles.

=== Second survey (1993) ===
The second took place from the 6 to the 13 June 1993. The second season at Gabal El Haridi focused more specifically on the mud-brick ruins first surveyed in 1991. The primary goal of the archaeologists was to record all of the extant walls and other features that could be measured using EES's electronic distance metering theodolite. The archaeologists also created a complete a full contour survey of the mud-brick area for topographical context with the intent of revealing the mud-brick structures identity and purpose. They hoped that this plan would allow for a general idea of the architecture of the site. Another goal of this survey was to produce a broad, dateable typology of pottery wares.

The mud-brick area near the base of the slope of Abu El Nasr is composed of ruined mud-brick walls and occupational debris. This site was found to consist of two distinct areas of ancient debris. The first was at the northern edge of Abu El Nasr and contained shallow mounds that were discolored by decaying mud-brick. The second area was greatly affected by erosion and weathering. The remains of this section included building remains, many of which were scattered down the hillside. A long wall was found to run southeast to northwest up the side of the mountain in the site for approximately fifty meters. Smaller complexes such as secondary walls surrounded this wall; these secondary walls ran down to the canal. An interesting characteristic in this area was the large rock-cut rooms with mud-brick structures constructed in front of them. One of these rooms was found to have a remarkable doorway with triangular stone projections mirrored on each side. The rock-cut rooms interconnected to room further in the walls. Each of these rooms was cut at differing levels in a semi-circular pattern. The chambers purpose is believed to be funerary; each chamber was a sufficient dimension to house a human body. The internal buildings architectural building techniques were revealed with the study of the natural topography. The inhabitants of the region during the time utilized and exploited the existing rock topography to create their elaborate structures.

Just to the north of the rock-cut structures were large amounts of pottery sherds. The amount of these sherds indicates that the side had intensive occupation focused in the north-easternmost area of the site, with the possibility of it occurring over a long period of time. The analysis of the pottery suggests that the occupation occurred through the Roman and Coptic periods. It was not possible to determine the place of pottery manufacturing, because no clear evidence of a kiln was discovered. Melted clay was found on the north side of the site, which may indicate an industrial area. During the pottery survey, a fragment of a molded pottery lamp was recovered near the rock-cut tombs. The design elements of the lamp indicated to the archaeologists that it was from the third to fourth centuries, but has been more recently suggested that it is from the second century. These lamps are representative of the earliest objects that have been uncovered on the surface of these mud-brick structures. According to Christopher Kirby the impression left to the archaeologists was that the site was a domestic settlement with insular character. This was suggested because of the cemetery that was found within the enclosure wall.

When the analysis of the pottery and the architecture and scale of the walls were combined, the archaeologists at the site suggested that some of the structure remains might be one of an office building or a possible fortified Coptic monastery. Evidence from the first season of work showed Coptic hermit use of the ancient quarries for occupation. Another structural component the supports the idea of a monastery is the un-walled settlement that was found north of the site. The pattern of un-walled and walled complexes also occurs at the Monastery of Saint Epiphanius in Western Thebes. The reason for the Coptic monks and hermits location choice is not known, but an idea is that they travelled and inhabited this region because of the ascetic life the sought. When the Coptic Church was reformed under Pachomius the Great, the hermits throughout the regions were brought together into organized communities. These communities typically occurred within walled enclosures, giving the possibility that Gabal El Haridi was one of them.

=== Third survey (1998) ===
The third and final survey occurred from the 19 July to the 16 August 1998. The third and final season at Gabal El Haridi purpose was to analyze the necropolis, the record the mud-brick structures outside the Ptolemaic Quarry E and to survey the northern side of the headland. The first section of the site the archaeological team focused on was the preservation of the painted Tomb 2. The conservation effort revealed that the painting has order and symmetry that was not visible previously. The necropolis showed sign of being illicitly dug because of the scattered contents on the slopes in front of the tomb. Tomb 30 was especially interesting because of its re-use patterns during the Coptic Period. The re-use is consistent with it being used as a Catholic church because of the Latin character that ran around the rim of the chamber. Treasure hunters had vandalized the other tombs throughout the necropolis. The vandalism combined with the natural deterioration, many important pieces of information was lost, such as the owners of the tombs. The other significant tomb was Tomb 207. An inscribed image of the tomb owner was found on each side of the entrance. The figures clumsy proportions and the angular frame suggest that this tomb was created during the First Intermediate Period. Fortunately, enough data was recovered to help with the understanding of when the site was occupied.

Each of the following seasons focused on specific sections of the site that were uncovered previously. Even though the site has been looted, weathered and eroded throughout time, the site archaeologists believed that it was still possible for a broad archaeological survey to produce meaningful data relating the date and nature of Gabal El Haridi.

== 2022 Egyptian mission excavations ==
The Egyptian archeological mission unearthed a total of 85 tombs, dating back to the period from the Old Kingdom of Egypt until the Ptolemaic dynasty spanning from 305 BC to 30 BC. The tombs vary in their plans; some are rock-cut in different levels of the mountain, some with one or several burial shafts, and others have a sliding corridor leading into a burial chamber. Inside the Ptolemaic tombs, human remains -some mummified- were discovered with a number of 30 mummies labels –a permit for the burial– written in ancient Greek, hieratic, or demotic script. Those cards usually recorded the name of the deceased, the father or mother’s name, place of origin, profession, and age at the time of death alongside ancient Egyptian hymns and prayers. The mission also unearthed a mudbrick-made tower house built to monitor the nomes' borders, collect taxes and secure the navigation traffic of sailing boats on the Nile River, dating back to the era of Ptolemy III Euergetes, the third pharaoh of the Ptolemaic dynasty ruling from 246 BC to 222 BC. The mission also unearthed remains of a Ptolemaic temple dedicated to the Goddess Isis and was dated to the reign of Ptolemy III Euergetes, parts of which were discovered during the early 2000s (located at 26°45′39″N 31°33′49″E). The discovered temple measures 33 meters in length and 14 meters in width, with north to south axis. The layout of the temple consists of a rectangular courtyard with 4 columns in the middle, followed by a hall with two columns which finally leads to the holy of holies. During the excavations, the team discovered a limestone purification basin and a votive stela at the north of the temple as well as 5 ostraca with demotic inscriptions, 38 Roman coins, and bones coming from animals consumed as food by the temple priests. The team also documented a number of quarries at the site including Ramses III quarry of the 19th Dynasty mentioned in Papyrus Harris “Ramses III sent 38 quarry craftsmen to the gebel to cut stones to build a temple for him in the 10th nome.”

== See also ==
- List of ancient Egyptian sites, including sites of temples
