= Apollonopolis Parva =

Apollonopolis Parva, Apollinopolis Parva, or Little Apollonopolis may refer to two ancient cities in Egypt:

- Apollonopolis Parva (Hypselis) in the Hypseliote nome, today known as Qus
- Apollonopolis Parva (Coptos) in the Coptite nome

== See also ==
- Apollonopolis (disambiguation)
