= Apollonopolis =

Apollonopolis or Apollinopolis (Greek: Ἀπόλλωνος πόλις) may refer to any of several ancient cities in Egypt or Aethiopia, including:

- Apollonopolis Magna, the "Great Apollonopolis", capital of its own nome, now Edfu, Egypt
- Apollonopolis Parva, the "Lesser Apollonopolis", was applied to two different cities:
  - Apollonopolis Parva (Hypselis) in the Hypseliote nome
  - Apollonopolis Parva in the Coptite nome, now Qus
- Apollonos Hydreium in the Thebaid was called Apollonopolis
- Apollonopolis in eastern Aethiopia
