= Abanoub (Coptic bishop) =

Coptic bishop

- Assistant Bishop for the Patriarchal Suffragan Diocese of Mokattam Mountain
- Native name: نيافة الأنبا أبانوب
- Church: Coptic Orthodox Church of Alexandria
- Diocese: Suffragan Diocese of Mokattam Mountain
- Installed: 16 June 2013

Orders
- Consecration: by Tawadros II

Personal details
- Born: 2 February 1957 (age 69)
- Denomination: Coptic Orthodox Christian

Abanoub (born 2 February 1957) is a clergyman of the Coptic Orthodox Church, since 2013 bishop of Al-Mokattam.

== Monastic life ==
On 17 April 1992, he made his religious vows. He was ordained a priest on 23 January 2005. He was ordained bishop on 15 June 2013.

== See also ==
- Coptic Orthodox Church
- Holy Synod of the Coptic Orthodox Church
