= Metropolitan Wissa of El Balyana =

Egyptian metropolitan bishop

His Eminence Wissa
- Metropolitan of El Balyana, Bardis, Awlad Toukh and its Jurisdictions.
- Native name: الأنبا ويصا
- Church: Coptic Orthodox Church
- Metropolis: El Balyana
- Diocese: El Balyana
- Predecessor: Yosab

Orders
- Ordination: 3 July 1973
- Consecration: 22 June 1975 by Pope Shenouda III
- Rank: Metropolitan Bishop

Personal details
- Born: Botros Youssef Takla; 16 July 1939 (age 86) Tanta, Gharbia, Egypt
- Education: Bachelor of Agriculture
- Alma mater: Cairo University

Metropolitan Wissa (Arabic: الأنبا ويصا, Coptic: Ⲁⲃⲃⲁ Ⲃⲏⲥⲁ) is the serving Metropolitan Bishop of the Coptic Orthodox Diocese of El Balyana, in Sohag Governorate, Egypt. His Diocese encompasses the districts of El Balyana (Abydos), Bardis (district), Awlad Toukh and the villages under their jurisdictions.

== Early life ==
He was born as Botros Youssef Takla (Arabic: بطرس يوسف تكلا), on 16 July 1939 in the city of Tanta, Gharbiya Governorate, Kingdom of Egypt. He was ordained as a chanter at the age of seven, and elevated to the rank of Reader in 1946 at the hands of Bishop Theophilus of the Syrian Monastery.

After enrolling in Cairo University, he relocated to Greater Cairo, and began serving in Sunday School in Rod el Farag. In 1959, Bishop Theophilus elevated him to the rank of Subdeacon. After receiving his Bachelor's of Agricultural Science from Cairo University, in 1962, he sought the monastic life.

== Monastic Life ==
He entered the Monastery of Saint Pishoy and was tonsured a monk by the name Anthimus of Saint Pishoy (Arabic: أنسيمس الأنبا بيشوى), on 10 March 1972.

On 3 July 1973, he was ordained a priest and his name was changed to Macarius of Saint Pishoy (Arabic: مكاريوس الأنبا بيشوى). He was later elevated to the dignity of Hegumen in 1974. Due to his expertise in Church rites and hymnology, he was one of the priests responsible for teaching newly ordained priests the rites of service, although he was himself technically a novice priest.

In August 1974, he was sent by Pope Shenouda III to Paris, France, to serve the Coptic Diaspora community there. He was later recalled to Cairo in June 1975 to be consecrated as bishop. Although his time in France was brief, he managed to revitalize service in the French Coptic Orthodox Church, and even began publishing a Magazine for the community titled Helpis ("Hope", Coptic: Ϩⲉⲗⲡⲓⲥ).

== Episcopate ==
=== Consecration as Bishop ===
On the Feast of Pentecost, 22 June 1975, he was consecrated as Bishop Wissa of Al Balyana, alongside Bishop Pimen of Malawi and Bishop Hedra of Aswan. His consecration was conducted by over twenty Metropolitans and Bishops. This was the largest number of Coptic bishops ever gathered for a consecration or ordination up to that point in history.

In 1976, he founded the first Coptic Orthodox Theological Seminary in El Balyana. He also founded the Convent of Saint Demiana in Souhag.

=== Imprisonment ===
He was among the Coptic clergy imprisoned by President Anwar al-Sadat in his final act of repression, the September Arrests of 1981. He spent the majority of his imprisonment in the Al-Marg and Tura penitentiaries until his release from prison by President Hosni Mubarak. He would later comment that the period of imprisonment which him and the other bishops faced had made them stronger.

=== Elevation to Metropolitan ===
On 19 March 2006, he was elevated to the dignity of Metropolitan by Pope Shenouda III. During the reign of Pope Shenouda III, he served as the Head of the Rites Committee of the Holy Synod.

== See also ==
- The Kosheh Massacres
