= September Arrests of 1981 (Egypt) =

1981 Egyptian political imprisonment

The September Arrests of 1981 or the September Arrests were a series of political arrests conducted by then Egyptian President Anwar al-Sadat starting on 3 September 1981. The arrests aimed at silencing all opposition to the Camp David Accords. Over 1,600 people were arrested and falsely imprisoned, including leaders of the opposition, as well as intellectuals, writers, journalists and religious leaders (both Christian and Muslim); countless others were placed under house arrest.

== Prelude ==
=== Opposition to the Camp David Accords ===
Following the 6th of October War, Egypt and Israel began a series of American backed Peace talks at Camp David which culminated in a peace treaty between the two long-feuding countries. The peace treaty, while held by Sadat to be a victory for Egypt, was unpopular both at home and abroad in the Arab world. A diplomatic crisis arose shortly after as many Arab leaders severed ties with Egypt in protest over its "normalization" of relations with Israel. Reactions to the treaty at home were mixed. Many were glad to be rid of the wars which had cost them so much, however, there was diverse opposition to the treaty.

=== El-Zawya al-Hamra ===
Throughout his reign, Sadat had used Islamists to combat leftist and socialist movements in the country. These Islamists, however, had their own agenda and goals, and did not fully cooperate with Sadat's regime. Part of the Islamist agenda was fostering sectarian violence and conduction of pogroms and massacres against the Coptic Orthodox Christian minority in Egypt. In June 1981, Islamists attacked the Copts in the Cairo suburb of el-Zawya al-Hamra. The attack left 80 Copts dead and hundreds injured. This rise in sectarian violence would be used by Sadat's government as a justification for the September arrests.

== Arrests ==
=== September 3rd Arrests ===
Upon his return from a trip to the USA, frustrated by years of opposition to the Camp David Accords, Sadat decided to take action against public figures who opposed the treaty. In the early hours of 3 September 1981, Egyptian forces began arresting lists of Sadat's opponents. These arrests would continue to be carried out throughout the month of September. Official government statements released by the Sadat regime declared that only 1536 dissenters had been arrested, however, independent sources claim that these figures only represented the number rounded up in the first three days of arrests, and that several thousands more were detained after the initial crackdown on 3 September.

=== 5 September Speech ===
Following the arrests, Sadat gave an address to the Parliament on 5 September 1981. In his speech, he aimed to justify the arrests through a legal guise. He claimed that the arrests were warranted and were the result of the sectarian violence that had broken out in June, citing the emergency powers given to the president by Article 74 of the Egyptian Constitution to counteract sectarian violence and insurrection. Thus, in his speech Sadat aimed to use the sectarian violence as justification for his enaction of emergency measures, however, months had passed since the events. Sadat blamed the alleged continuation of civil strife on Pope Shenouda III, claiming that his declaration of a state of mourning and refusal to celebrate the feast of the Resurrection had contributed to animosity between Christians and Muslims. As a result, Sadat withdrew State recognition from Pope Shenouda III as Pope of Alexandria, and declared that the state would form a delegation of five bishops to govern the Coptic Church.

=== Exile of Pope Shenouda III ===
Following the speech made by Sadat withdrawing state recognition from Pope Shenouda III, the Egyptian Military Police laid siege to the Monastery of Saint Pishoy and the Monastery of the Syrians in Wadi al-Natrun, where he was staying for a spiritual retreat. Following this operation, the Egyptian government continued to hold Pope Shenouda III under house arrest within the Monastery of Saint Pishoy.

=== Extra Measures Taken ===
The arrests were accompanied with the shutdown of numerous religious, political, and independent publications and organizations. A decree was issued to disband the Muslim Brotherhood as well as six other Islamic societies, and three Christian societies. Government employees in the media, education, as well as other sectors who had any opposition tendencies were shifted to less desirable positions and placed under surveillance.

== Aftermath ==
=== Assassination of Sadat ===
On 6 October 1981, four weeks after the arrests began, Sadat was shot down by Islamists during a military victory parade celebrating the eighth anniversary of the Yom Kippur War. Following his death, the prison conditions were slightly improved for the prisoners. In 1983, the then new President of Egypt Hosni Mubarak began gradually releasing the arrestees. Some were released automatically, others were released through court orders. The last of Sadat's September Arrestees to be released was Pope Shenouda III on 1 January 1985.

=== Legacy ===
Mohamed Hassanein Heikal, an influential Egyptian Journalist and intellectual was among those arrested on 3 September. He would later document the events in a his book Autumn of Fury. He wrote that the arrests on influential journalists, party leaders, and religious leaders, were quasi-militaristic operations carried out by special task-forces. Saifnaz Kazem, an Egyptian literary critic claimed that the arrests were an attempt by Sadat to demonstrate his control over the country and Egyptian society as a whole. She also reported that those imprisoned were deprived of basic human dignity and rights. Metropolitan Wissa of El Balyana, Coptic Metropolitan bishop of El Balyana and one of the last September Arrestees to be released, said that the imprisonment made him and the other bishops stronger.

The arrests and the crackdown on free speech were attested at that time to be the widest wave of arrests in the history of Egypt, hitting all political wings, and people from all walks of life. They are commonly referred to as "Sadat's Final Act of Repression."
