= Diocese of Antinoe =

Catholic titular diocese in Egypt

The Archdiocese of Antinoe is titular diocese of the Roman Catholic Church in the Province of Egypt. It was part of the Patriarchate of Alexandria, and the bishopric was based on Antinoë in the Nile Valley. It was also known as Antinoöpolis.

== History ==
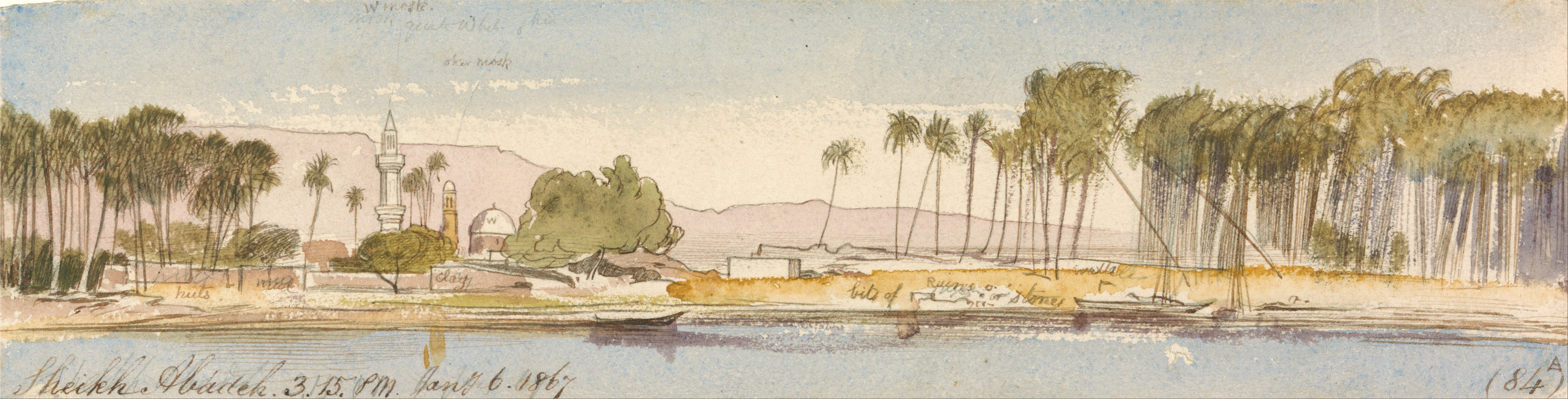
Sheikh Abadeh, January 1867

Antinoe (modern Sheykh Abade), was a town in the Roman province of Thebaid I. The town had a high number of martyrs during the Diocletianic Persecution indicating a Christian community in the late 3rd century and early 4th century.

The diocese was originally established in the 4th century as a suffragan of the Archdiocese of Ptolemais but was elevated to the rank of a metropolitan see in the 5th century. According to the Commanville, Antinoe eventually had eight suffragan dioceses of its own: Hermopolis, Cuse, Lycopolis, Ipseli, Lesser Apollonopoli, Anteopoli (Antaeus), Panopolis and Erzurum.

The archdiocese disappeared with the Arab conquest of Egypt. However, the existence of two Coptic bishops, Menna in the 8th century and Isaac in the 11th century indicates that a Christian community continued. The Muslims had a particular veneration for Bishop Ammon, who they called Al-Adeb (the educator) and it seems the Arabic name of the village of Sheykh Abade derives from him.

Today Antinoe is a titular archdiocese; the seat is currently vacant.

=== List of known bishops ===
- Talbot (mentioned in 325)
- Lucio (mentioned in 325) (Meletian bishop)
- Ammonium (or Ammoniano) (before 347)
- Arius (mentioned in 347)
- Macario (mentioned in approximately 350)
- Ammon (mentioned in 394) [2]
- Athanasius (4th-5th century)
- Teodoro (mentioned in approximately 450)
- Procopius (mentioned in 553)
- Senuzio (mentioned in approximately 600)
- Victor (5th-7th centuries)
- Menna (mentioned in 751) (Coptic Orthodox bishop)
- Isaac (5th-7th centuries) (Coptic Orthodox bishop)

The following bishops are only titular.

- Valerio Bellati (September 5, 1725 – 1741)
- Florence MacCarthy (March 6, 1803 – 1810)
- James Keating (January 12, 1819 – March 9, 1819)
- Giacomo Stella (September 27, 1819 – June 4, 1829)
- John Baptist Scandella (April 28, 1857 – August 27, 1880)
- Ignatius Mark (April 26, 1881 – January 2, 1901)
- Antonio Sabatucci (March 22, 1892 [6]-December 31, 1920)
- Angelo Paino (January 10, 1921 – February 23, 1923)
- Julio Ramón Riveiro y Jacinto. (February 11, 1923 – May 8, 1931)
- Adelrich (Alois von der heiligen Maria) Benziger, (July 23, 1931 – August 17, 1942)
- Justin Daniel Simonds (September 6, 1942 – November 6, 1963 succeeded Archbishop of Melbourne)
- Joseph Emmanuel Descuffi (November 4, 1965 – 1971)
- Varkey Vithayathil (April 19, 1997 – December 23, 1999 appointed major Archbishop of Ernakulam-Angamaly)
