= Sohag Governorate =

Governorate of Egypt

- Governorate
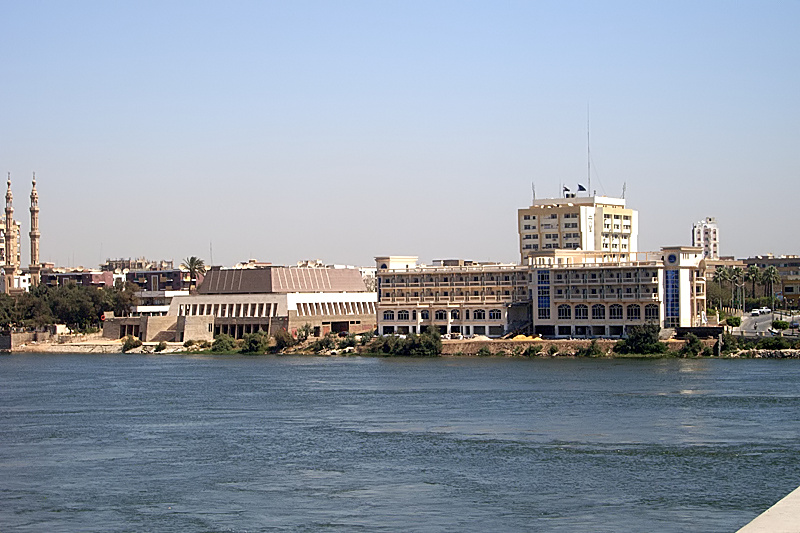
- View of Sohag

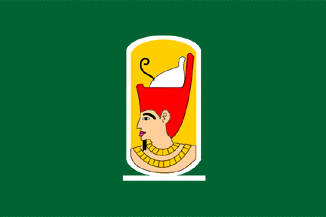
- Flag

- Sohag Governorate on the map of Egypt
- Coordinates: 26.56°N 31.7°E
- Country: Egypt
- Seat: Sohag (capital)

Government
  - Governor: Abdel-Fattah Noureldin Serag

Area
  - Total: 1,547 km^{2} (597 sq mi)

Population (January 2024)
  - Total: 5,853,394
  - Density: 3,784/km^{2} (9,800/sq mi)

GDP
  - Total: EGP 108 billion (US$ 6.9 billion)
- Time zone: UTC+2 (EGY)
  - Summer (DST): UTC+3 (EEST)
- HDI (2021): 0.685 medium · 21st
- Website: www.sohag.gov.eg

Sohag (Arabic: محافظة سوهاج) is one of the governorates of Egypt. It is located in the southern part of the country (Upper Egypt), and covers a stretch of the Nile Valley. Since 1960, its capital has been the city of Sohag. Prior to that, the capital was the city of Girga and the name of the governorate was Girga Governorate.

== Overview ==
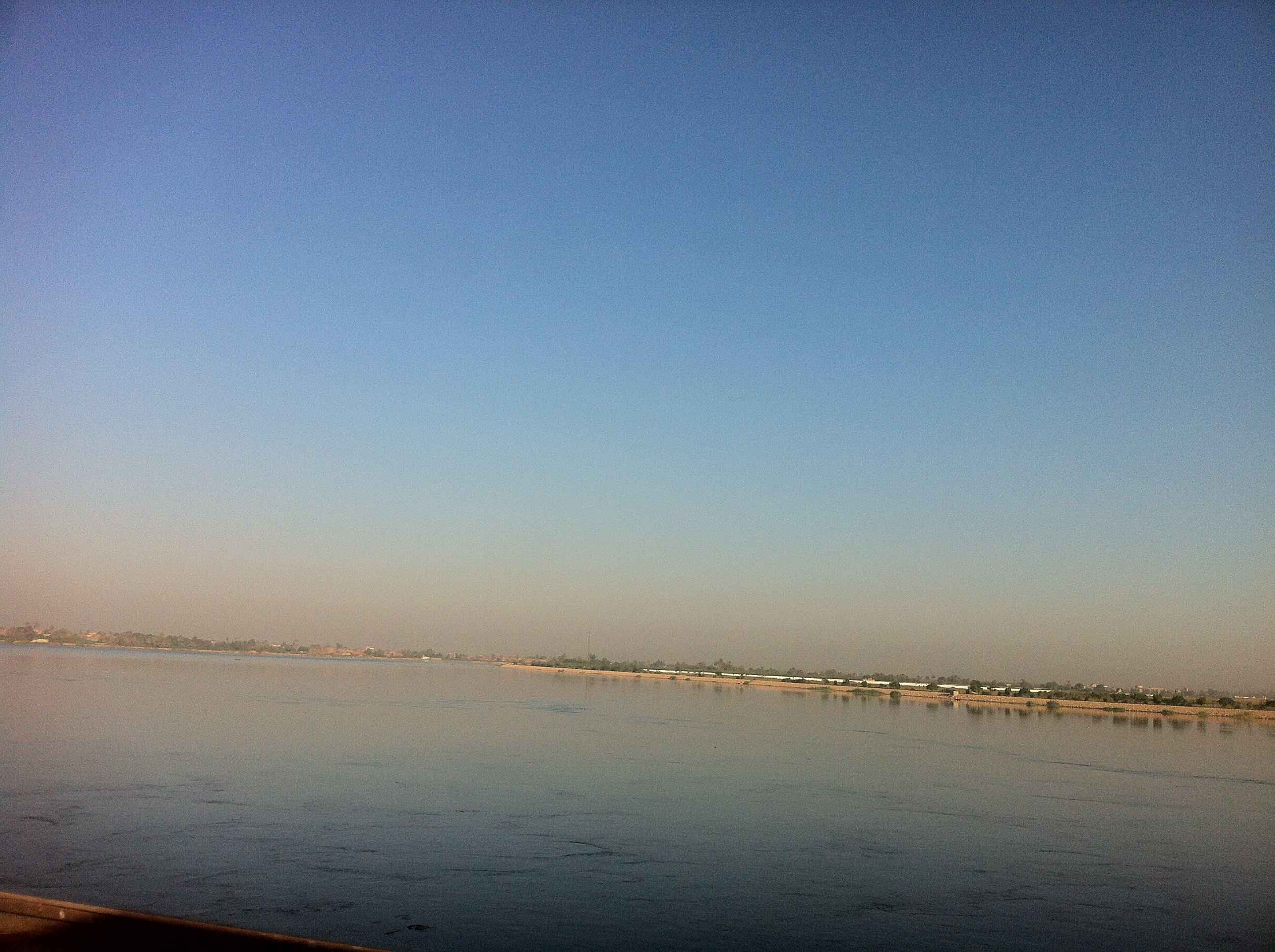
Al Hager Bawlad Yehya, Markaz Dar El-Salam, Sohag Governorate, Egypt

The rate of poverty is more than 60% in this governorate but recently some social safety networks have been provided in the form of financial assistance and job opportunities. The funding has been coordinated by the country's Ministry of Finance and with assistance from international organizations.

In early 2019, some residents of the poorer villages of Sohag were able to move into their new homes built, in part, with aid from the National Bank of Kuwait. There was a celebration for the completion of 115 homes where residents also received cattle and other gifts.

== Archaeology ==
In April 2019, the archaeological mission of the Ministry of Tourism and Antiquities led by Mostafa Waziri uncovered a tomb of a nobleman called Toutou and his wife at al-Dayabat archaeological site dating back to the Ptolemaic Kingdom. The tomb contained two tiny rooms with two limestone sarcophagi as well as a well-preserved mummy and mummified animals (including falcons, eagles, cats, dogs and shrews) were also revealed in the tomb.

In January 2026, archaeologists announced the discovery of a Byzantine-era monastic complex at Al-Qarya bi-Al-Duweir in the Tima district. The Egyptian archaeological mission, conducted by the Supreme Council of Antiquities, uncovered the foundations of multiple mudbrick buildings that formed a monastic residential settlement dating to the Byzantine period. The remains include rectangular halls, cells believed to have served as monks’ living and worship spaces, and plastered walls with niches, while courtyards and small circular structures likely functioned as communal areas. Evidence of a central church with a nave, choir and sanctuary suggests organized religious life, and ancillary features such as red-brick and limestone basins indicate water storage or auxiliary functions. Artefacts recovered at the site included storage amphorae and Coptic-inscribed ostraca.

== Municipal divisions ==
The governorate is divided into municipal divisions with a total estimated population as of January 2024 of 5,853,394. In the case of Sohag governorate, there are two new cities, five agsam and twelve markaz. In some instances there is a markaz and a kism with the same name.

Municipal Divisions
Anglicized name	Native name	Arabic transliteration	Population (July 2017 Est.)	Type
Akhmim	مركز أخميم	Akhmīm	498,670	Markaz
El Balyana	مركز البلينا	Al-Balyanā	595,606	Markaz
El Kawthar	قسم الكوثر	Al-Kawthar	5,543	Kism (fully urban)
El Maragha	مركز المراغة	Al-Marāghah	447,222	Markaz
El Munsha	مركز المنشأة	Al-Munsha'āh	458,552	Markaz
Aserat	مركز العسيرات	Al-'Usayrāt	195,927	Markaz
Dar El Salam	مركز دار السلام	Dar as-Salām	466,727	Markaz
Girga	قسم جرجا	Jirjā	146,756	Kism (urban and rural parts)
Girga	مركز جرجا	Jirjā	376,144	Markaz
Juhaynah West	مركز جهينة الغربية	Juhaynah al-Gharbiyah	309,544	Markaz
New Akhmim	مدينة أخميم الجديدة	Madīnat Akhmīm al-Jadīdah	0	New City
New Sohag	مدينة سوهاج الجديدة	Madīnat Sawhāj al-Jadīdah	200	New City
Saqultah	مركز ساقلته	Sāqultah	235,361	Markaz
Sohag	مركز سوهاج	Sawhāj	608,574	Markaz
Sohag 1	قسم اول سوهاج	Sawhāj 1	150,616	Kism (fully urban)
Sohag 2	قسم ثان سوهاج	Sawhāj 2	124,746	Kism (fully urban)
Tahta	قسم طهطا	Ṭahṭā	187,903	Kism (urban and rural parts)
Tahta	مركز طهطا	Ṭahṭā	327,950	Markaz
Tima	مركز طما	Ṭimā	486,899	Markaz

== Population ==
Historical population
Year	Pop.	±%
1937	1,118,402	—
1947	1,283,468	+14.8%
1957	1,449,000	+12.9%
1966	1,689,000	+16.6%
1976	1,924,960	+14.0%
1986	2,455,134	+27.5%
1996	3,123,114	+27.2%
2006	3,747,289	+20.0%
2015	4,603,861	+22.9%
2017	4,995,155	+8.5%
2018	5,063,000	+1.4%
2023	5,669,652	+12.0%

According to population estimates, in 2024 the majority of residents in the governorate lived in rural areas, with an urbanization rate of only 21.4%. Out of an estimated 5,853,394 people residing in the governorate in 2024, 4,600,768 people lived in rural areas and 1,252,626 lived in urban areas.

== Cities and towns ==
- Akhmim (Ipu or Khent-Min or Khemmis or Panopolis)
- Dar El Salam
- El Balyana
- El Mansha
- El Maragha
- El Usayrat
- Girga (Tjeny or Thinis)
- Juhayna
- Sakulta
- Sohag
- Tahta
- Tima

== Industrial zones ==
According to the Governing Authority for Investment and Free Zones (GAFI), the following industrial zones are located in Sohag:

Zone name
El Ahaywa Industrial Zone
El Kawthar Industrial Zone
Industrial Zone West of Tahta
New Sohag City Industrial Zone
Bet Daoud Industrial Zone West of Gerga

== Important sites ==
- Abydos (Abedju)
- Apollonos Polis (Kom Isfaht)
- Beit Khallaf
- El Hawawish
- El Salamuni
- Gabal El Haridi
- Hut-Repyt (Athribis or Wannina)
- Kom Ishqaw (Aphrodito)
- Tjebu (Djew-Qa or Antaeopolis or Qaw el-Kebir)
- Red Monastery
- White Monastery
- Sohag Museum

== Notable people ==
- Imad Hamdi (actor)
- Hamdy Ahmed (actor)
- George Sidhum (actor)
- Sawiris family (business family)
- Muhammad Siddiq Al-Minshawi (Quran Reciter)
