= Hypsela =

Hypsela may refer to:

- Hypsela (plant) a plant genus now considered to be a synonym of Lobelia
- Hypselis, ancient city in Egypt
