= El Usayrat =

El Usayrat العسيرات
- Location in Egypt
- Coordinates: 26°22′N 31°50′E
- Country: Egypt
- Governorate: Sohag
- Time zone: UTC+2 (EET)
  - Summer (DST): UTC+3 (EEST)

El Usayrat (Arabic: العسيرات) is a small city in the Sohag Governorate of Upper Egypt. It is situated near Sohag, on the east bank of the Nile. It used to be part of El Monshah, but became a separate city in 2008.
