= May (governor) =

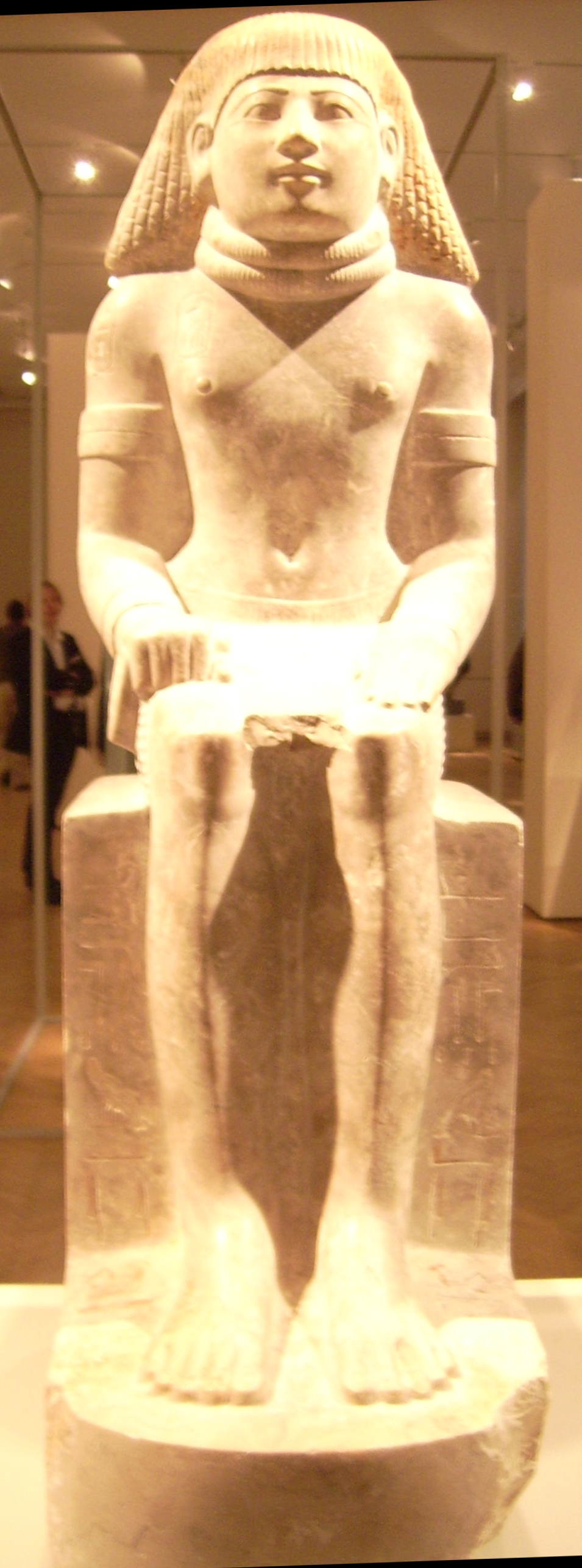
Statue of May, Egyptian Museum in Berlin

May was an ancient Egyptian official of the New Kingdom who was in office under Pharaoh Thutmose III.

May is known from his tomb in Qaw el-Kebir and from one, perhaps two, statues. He bears the titles mayor and overseer of priest and was therefore most likely the local governor at Qaw el-Kebir, ancient Tjebu.

The tomb of May was excavated at Qaw el-Kebir. It has several underground chambers. Here were also found the fragments of his sarcophagus, that was smashed into pieces. The sarcophagus was decorated on the inside and on the outside, providing the names and titles of May.

There is a statue of May in the Egyptian Museum in Berlin, which shows him sitting on a chair. The inscriptions provide his name and titles. On the statue appears also the name of king Thutmosis III, providing a precise dating. Around the neck of the statue, he wears the gold of honor. He must have received it from the king. A second statue now in the Luxor Museum is very close in style and also shows an official with the gold of honor. The statue is not inscribed but might depict May as well.
