= Apollonos Hydreium =

Ancient Egyptian country

Coordinates: 24°29′54″N 34°44′53″E

Apollonos Hydreium (Plin. vi. 26; It. Anton.) or Apollinopolis or Apollonopolis (Greek: Ἀπόλλωνος πόλις), was an ancient city of Egypt that stood upon the high road from Coptos, in the Thebaid, to Berenice on the Red Sea, and was a watering station for the caravans in their transit between those cities.
