= Epistrategos =

Epistrategos (Ancient Greek: ἐπιστράτηγος, lit. 'over-general'; Latin: epistrategus) was a senior military and administrative office in Ptolemaic Egypt, which was retained during the subsequent Roman period as well. Each epistrategos were responsible for an epistrategy (Ancient Greek: ἐπιστρατηγία, romanized: epistratēgia).

Under Ptolemaic rule, a Greek strategos was appointed to each of the Egyptian nomes, originally as garrison commander for the Greek troops, but soon eclipsing the nomarch and assuming administrative duties as well. Gradually, a number of nomes began being placed under the authority of a single strategos, and under Ptolemy II Philadelphus (r. 283 – 246 BC), the office of epistrategos of the "Chora" (i.e. the interior country) was established, with authority over the other strategoi in the entirety of Egypt beyond the capital, Alexandria. Later, a second epistrategos was created for the Thebaid. As with most of the Ptolemaic system, the office was retained after the Roman takeover in 30 BC, with a layer of Roman officials under the augustal prefect grafted onto the existing administrative structure. The office remained important, although it apparently lost any military responsibility; very soon, it came to be held by Roman citizens of equestrian status. Reflecting the Roman division of Egypt in three broad areas (the Nile Delta area or Lower Egypt, Middle Egypt or Heptanomis, and the Thebaid), during the Roman era there were three or four epistrategoi, as there were often two holders of the office in Lower Egypt, one for the east and one for the west.

== Sources ==
- Thomas, J. David (1975). The epistrategos in Ptolemaic and Roman Egypt, Part 1: The Ptolemaic epistrategos. Opladen: Westdeutscher Verlag. ISBN 3-531-09906-X.
- Thomas, J. David (1982). The epistrategos in Ptolemaic and Roman Egypt, Part 2: The Roman epistrategos. Opladen: Westdeutscher Verlag. ISBN 3-531-09914-0.
- Vandoni, Mariangela (1971). Gli Epistrategi nell' Egitto greco-romano (in Italian). Milan.
