= Anba Angaelos =

Coptic Bishop

Angaelos OBE
- Bishop
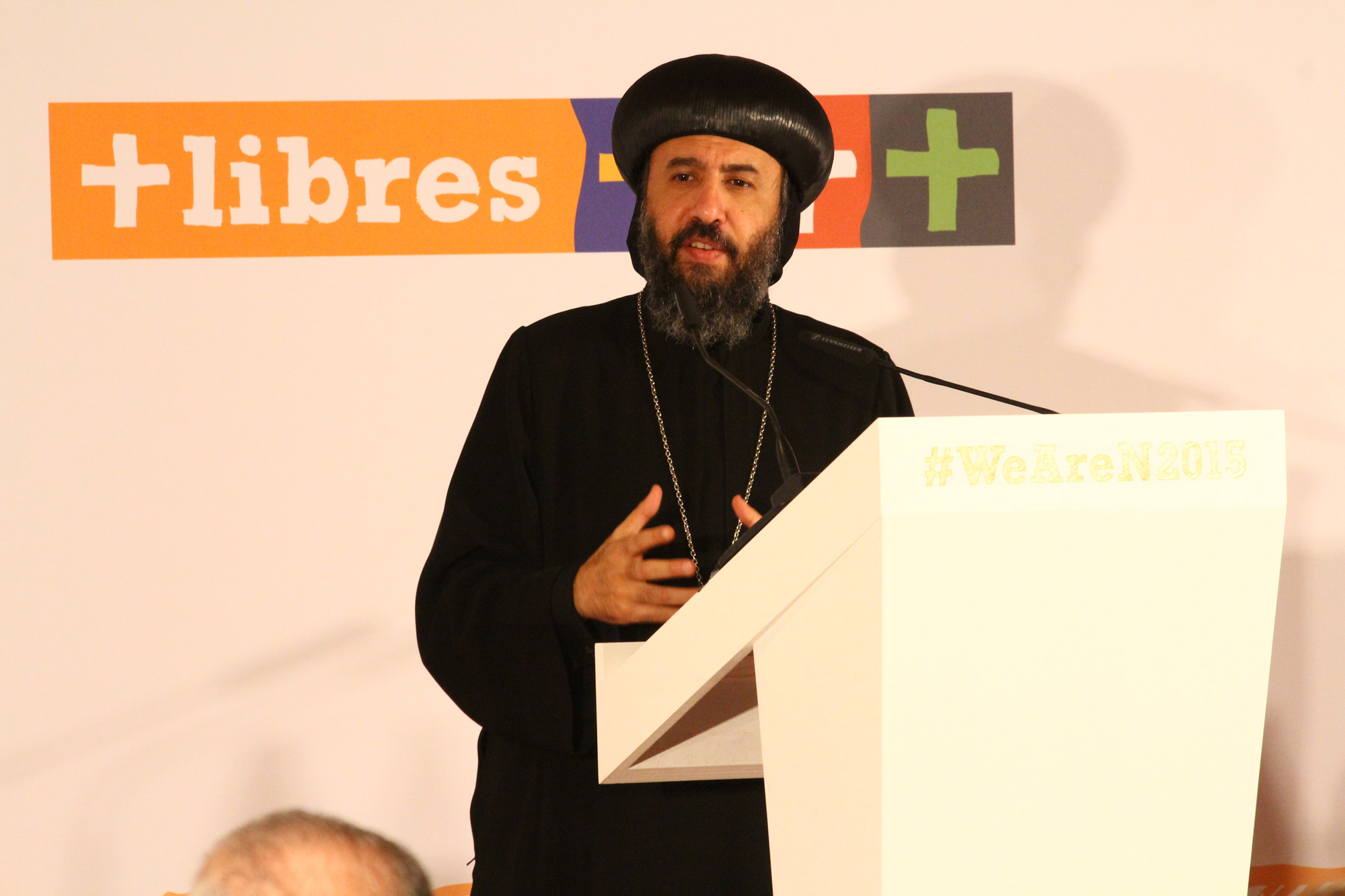
- Installed: 14 November 1999
- Other post: Member of the Holy Synod of the Coptic Orthodox Church

Orders
- Ordination: 1999
- Consecration: Consecrated by Pope Shenouda III

Personal details
- Born: 1967 (age 58–59) Cairo, Egypt
- Denomination: Coptic Orthodox
- Residence: United Kingdom

Bishop Angaelos OBE is the Coptic Orthodox Bishop of London and is the official representative of Pope Tawadros II to the UK.

== Early life ==
Angaelos was born in Cairo, Egypt and emigrated with his family to Australia, where he spent his childhood years. He obtained a Bachelor of Arts, majoring in political science, philosophy and sociology, and went on to postgraduate studies in law whilst working in the same field.

== Religious life ==
In 1990, Angaelos returned to Egypt to join the Monastery of Saint Bishoy in Wadi-El-Natroun, where he was subsequently consecrated a monk by Pope Shenouda III. He served as Papal secretary until 1995, and was then delegated by the Pope to serve as a parish priest in the United Kingdom. He was consecrated in 1999 as a General Bishop (a rank between auxiliary bishop and chorbishop) in the United Kingdom of the Coptic Orthodox Church. He was then enthroned as the first Coptic Orthodox Bishop of London (ecclesial title given by Pope Tawadros II) on 18 November 2017.

== Political awards and activism ==
In the 2015 Queen's Birthday Honours, Angaelos was appointed an Officer of the Order of the British Empire (OBE) for services to international religious freedom.

Bishop Angaelos is President of Bible Society.

== See also ==
- The Holy Synod of the Coptic Orthodox Church
- Coptic Orthodox Church in Europe
- List of Copts
