= Metropolitan Paphnutius of Samalut =

His Eminence Paphnutius
- Metropolitan of Samalut, Taha al-Amida and its Jurisdictions.
- Native name: الأنبا بفنوتيوس
- Church: Coptic Orthodox Church
- Metropolis: Samalut
- Diocese: Samalut
- Predecessor: Sawires

Orders
- Ordination: 30 March 1975
- Consecration: 13 June 1976 by Pope Shenouda III
- Rank: Metropolitan Bishop

Personal details
- Born: 12 November 1948 Cairo, Egypt
- Education: Bachelor of Medicine, Bachelor of Surgery
- Alma mater: Cairo University

Metropolitan Paphnutius or Pephnotious (Arabic: الأنبا بفنوتيوس,Coptic: Ⲁⲃⲃⲁ Ⲡⲁⲫⲛⲟⲩⲧⲓⲟⲥ) is the first Metropolitan Bishop of the Coptic Orthodox Diocese of Samalut and Taha al-Amida.

== Early life ==
He was born as Nagy Shoukry Morqos (Arabic: ناجي شكرى مرقس), on 12 November 1948 in Cairo. He received a Bachelor's of Medicine and Surgery in 1971.

== Monastic Life ==
On 14 January 1972, he entered the Monastery of the Syrians. On 12 March 1972, was tonsured a monk by the name Antonius the Syrian (Arabic: انطونيوس السريانى) by the hands of Bishop Theophilus, the abbot of the Monastery of the Syrians. He was ordained a priest on 30 March 1975, and was later elevated to the dignity of Hegumen by Pope Shenouda III on 4 June 1976. During his time in the monastery he served as a physician in the monastery clinic.

== Episcopate ==
=== Consecration as Bishop ===
On the Feast of Pentecost, 13 June 1976, he was ordained as Bishop Paphnutius by Pope Shenouda III, for the newly established Diocese of Samalut. He was received in Samalut and enthroned on 24 June 1976, in the presence of then Bishop Wissa of El Balyana, Bishop Pimen of Malawi, Bishop Arsanius of Minya, and Bishop Timotheos. He celebrated his first liturgy in the Diocese's Cathedral on 25 Jun 1976.

=== Elevation to Metropolitan ===
On 27 February 2016, he was elevated to the dignity of Metropolitan by Pope Tawadros II.
