= Nemty =

Egyptian god of ferrymen

- Illustration of Nemty on a boat
Name in hieroglyphs
G7AA
- Major cult center: Tjebu, Badari
- Symbol: Falcon

In Egyptian mythology, Nemty (Antaeus in Greek, but probably not connected to the Antaeus in Greek mythology) was a god whose worship centered at Antaeopolis in the northern part of Upper Egypt.

Nemty's worship is quite ancient, dating from at least the 2nd dynasty, at which point he already had priests dedicated to his cult. Originally, Nemty appears to have been the patron of the ancient area around Badari, which was the center of the cult of Horus. Due to lack of surviving information, it is not very well known what the original function of Nemty was or whether he was more than just a title of Horus referring to some specific function.

Over time, Nemty became considered simply as the god of ferrymen and was consequently depicted as a falcon standing on a boat, a reference to Horus, who was originally considered as a falcon. As god of ferrymen, he gained the title Nemty, meaning "(one who) travels". His later cult center was in Antaeopolis, but also in Per-Nemty (House of Nemty) in the 12th Upper Egyptian nome.

Nemty appears in the tale The Contendings of Horus and Seth which describes the settlement of the inheritance of Osiris, seen as a metaphor for the conquest of Lower Egypt by Upper Egypt (whose patron was Seth), at the beginning of the Old Kingdom. In this tale, one of Seth's attempts to gain power consists of his gathering together the gods and providing good arguments, convincing all of them (in later traditions, all except Thoth). Seth fears magical intervention by Isis, Horus' wife (in early Egyptian mythology), and so holds the gathering on an island, instructing Nemty not to allow anyone resembling Isis to be ferried there. However, Isis disguises herself as an old woman and unknowingly Nemty takes her across after being paid a gold ring, having rejected the first offer of gruel, resulting in the disruption of the council by her use of magic. Nemty is punished for his error, by having his toes cut off, which is more severe than it appears, since as a falcon, he would no longer be able to perch and thus would not be able to reside on the boat.

Two pharaohs bore theophoric names incorporating Nemty's, both during the Sixth Dynasty of Egypt at the end of the Old Kingdom period, Merenre Nemtyemsaf I and Merenre Nemtyemsaf II. Here Nemtyemsaf means "Nemty is his protection".

In older literature, the hieroglyphs of the god were read as Anti or Anty. Several studies confirmed that this reading is not correct.

"Nemty" is also the name of a ransomware program.
