= Arcadia Aegypti =

Roman province in northern Egypt

Provincia Arcadia Aegypti ἐπαρχία Αρκαδίας Αιγύπτου
- province of the Roman Empire, , Diocese of Egypt
- After 386 AD–641 AD
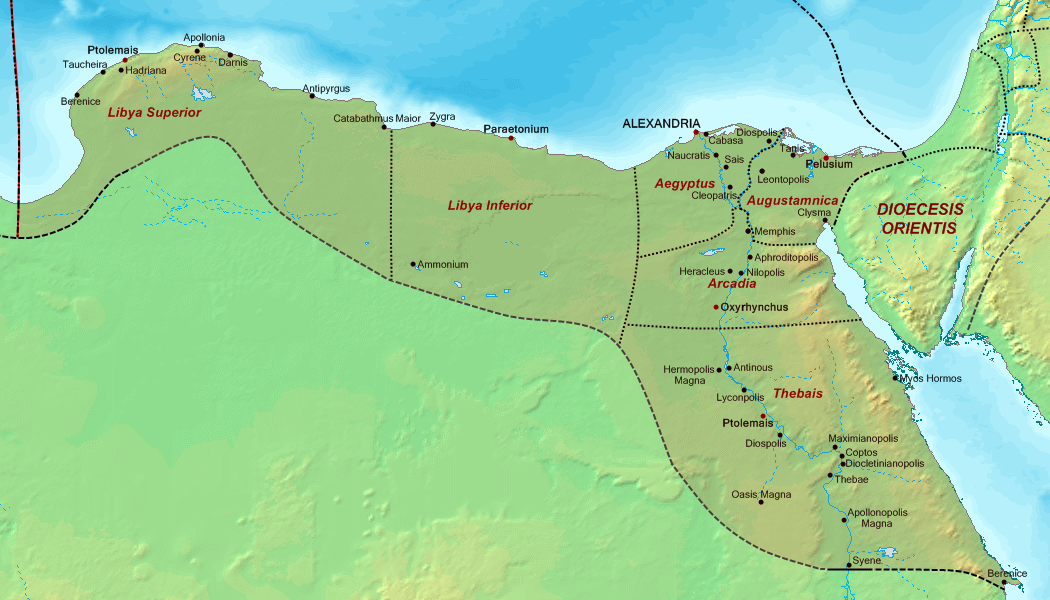
- Diocese of Egypt, c. 400 AD
- Capital: Oxyrhynchus
- Historical era: Late Antiquity
  - Division by emperor Diocletian: After 386 AD
  - Persian occupation: 612–628 AD
  - Arab–Byzantine wars: 641 AD
- Today part of: Egypt

Arcadia or Arcadia Aegypti was a Late Roman province in northern Egypt. It was named for one of the reigning Augusti of the Roman Empire, Arcadius (r. 383–408) of the Theodosian dynasty when it was created in the late 4th century. Its capital was Oxyrhynchus and its territory encompassed the Arsinoite nome and the "Heptanomia" ("seven nomes") region.

== History ==
It was created between 386 and ca. 395 out of the province of Augustamnica and most of the historical region known as "Heptanomis" ("seven nomes"), except for Hermopolis, which belonged to the Thebaid.

In the Notitia Dignitatum, Arcadia forms one of six provinces of the Diocese of Egypt, under a governor with the low rank of praeses.

By 636, the praeses governor had been replaced by a governor with the rank of dux.

== Episcopal sees ==
Ancient episcopal sees in the Roman province of Arcadia Aegypti, listed in the Annuario Pontificio as titular sees:

- Oxyrhynchus, the Metropolitan Archbishopric, so probably the provincial capital
- Alphocranon (Helwan)
- Aphroditopolis (Atfih)
- Arsinoë in Arcadia (Faiyum)
- Cynopolis in Arcadia (El-Queis? Cheikh-Fadl?)
- Heracleopolis Magna
- Memphis
- Nilopolis
- Theodosiopolis in Arcadia (Taha-el-Amudein)

== Sources ==
- Keenan, James K. (2000). "Egypt". In Cameron, Averil; Ward-Perkins, Bryan; Whitby, Michael (eds.). The Cambridge Ancient History, Volume XIV - Late Antiquity: Empire and Successors, A.D. 425–600. Cambridge University Press. pp. 612–637. ISBN 978-0-521-32591-2.
