= Delas =

Delas دلاص
- city
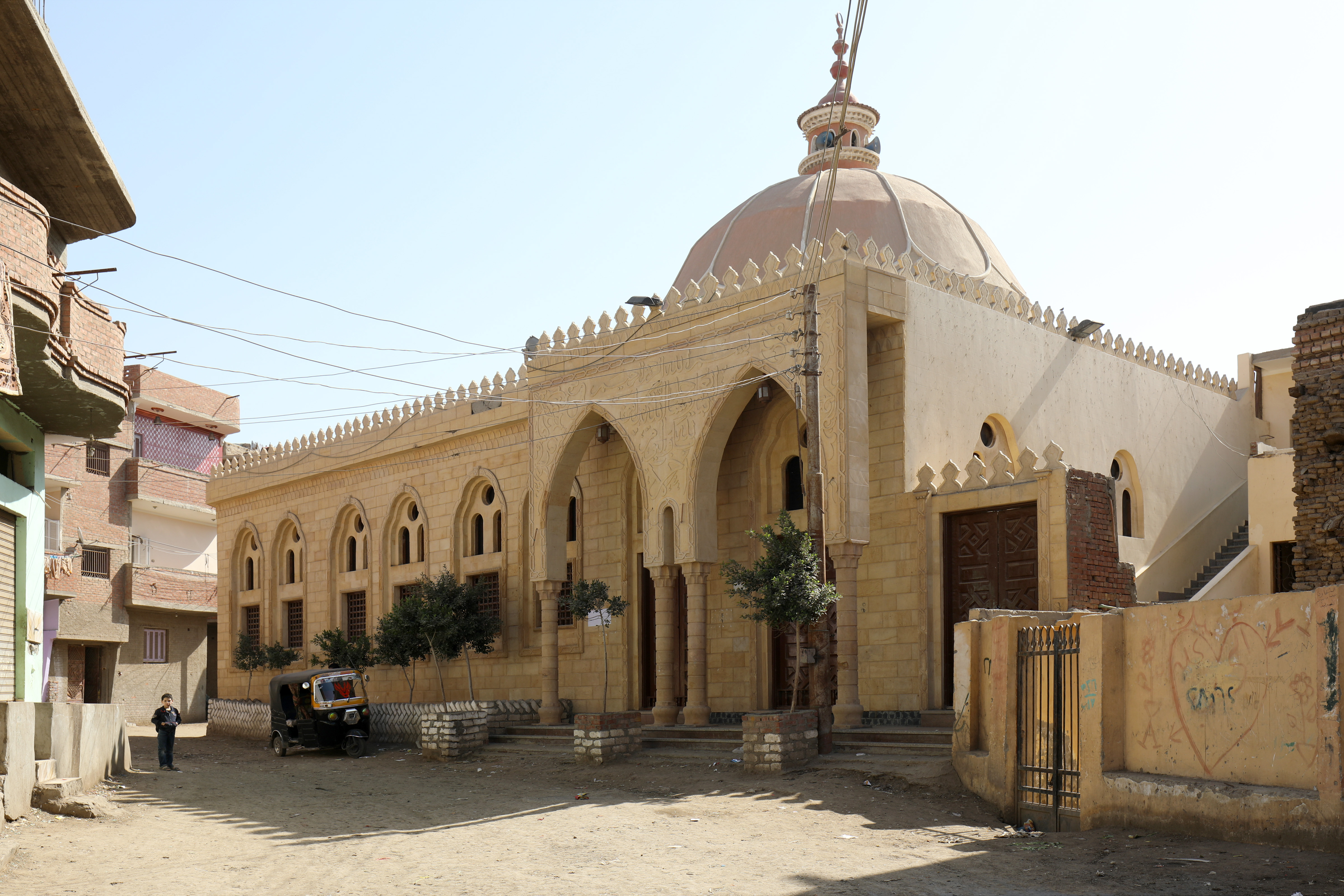
- The Great Mosque in Delas

- Location in Egypt
- Coordinates: 29°11′8.76″N 31°8′3.05″E
- Country: Egypt
- Governorate: Beni Suef
- Elevation: 29 m (95 ft)

Population (2006)
  - Total: 14,199
- Time zone: UTC+2 (EET)
  - Summer (DST): UTC+3 (EEST)

Delas (Arabic: دلاص, Coptic: ϯⲗⲟϫ, ⲧⲉⲗⲁϫ, romanized: Tiloj, Telaj, from Ancient Egyptian: Tȝ-lḏ) is a city in Beni Suef Governorate of Egypt, situated on the left bank of the Nile.

In Ptolemaic and Byzantine Egypt it was known as Tilothis (Ancient Greek: Τιλωθις) or Nilopolis (Ancient Greek: Νείλου πόλις). The city was also called Nilos (Νεῖλος).

It was an episcopal see that a suffragan of the metropolitan of Oxyrynchos, in the Roman province of Arcadia Aegypti, and is included as such in the Catholic Church's list of titular sees.

== History ==
In the 2nd century Ptolemy identified Tilothis, later renamed to Nilopolis, as part of the Herakleopolite nome, but by 225 A.D., it had become an independent nome. This fluctuation between independence and integration continued into the 6th century, with Nilopolis maintaining considerable economic and administrative significance. Ptolemy (IV, v, 26) also noted its unique location on an island in the Nile.

During the 5th and 6th centuries, its economic strength was evident in corn production and trade, comparable to the neighboring Herakleopolite and Oxyrhynchite nomes. Despite producing less corn than the Herakleopolites, its substantial tax contributions pointed to a thriving trade, bolstered by its strategic position on key trade routes.

Delas had a temple of Heracles, while a cult of Isis Lochia was also popular in the city. Eusebius (Ecclesiastical History, VI, xli) mentioned a bishop, Cheremon, in the city during Decius' persecution, highlighting its ecclesiastical importance. "The Chronicle of John of Nikiou" and Arabian medieval geographers also referenced the city, with the latter still using its original name, Delas. By the 14th century, despite its decline from raids by Berber Luwatah tribe and a reduced population, as noted by al-Idrisi, remained significant, paying 20,000 dinars in taxes and encompassing a large area of land.

In the khedival period, Delas was a part of the moudirieh of Beni-Suef in the district of El-Zaouiet, and had about 2500 inhabitants of whom nearly 1000 were nomadic Bedouins.
