= Saqultah =

Saqultah ساقلتة
- City
- Location in Egypt
- Coordinates: 26°39′N 31°40′E
- Country: Egypt
- Governorate: Sohag

Area
  - Total: 32.63 sq mi (84.51 km^{2})

Population (2021)
  - Total: 227,719
  - Density: 6,979/sq mi (2,695/km^{2})
- Time zone: UTC+2 (EET)
  - Summer (DST): UTC+3 (EEST)

Saqultah (Arabic: ساقلتة) is a small Upper Egyptian city near Akhmim. It is located on the east bank of the Nile, in the Sohag Governorate.

== Etymology ==
Saqultah is one of the oldest villages in Egypt, originally named Saqiyat Qultah, or Saqiyas of Kollouthos (Coptic: ⲕⲉⲗⲗⲟⲩϫ).

The city has been named in:

- the Laws of Court (قوانين الدواوين) by the 6th century Egyptian writer Al-Asaad bin Mamati
- the Tuhfat al-Irshad as El Quseyya
- the Mu’jam al-Buldan (glossary of countries): "Qulta is a good village, known as Saqiya Qalta in Upper Egypt, east of the Nile, near Akhmim."
- the works of Al-Suyuti, quoting the Akhmimiya.
- The name was changed from Saqiyat Qultah to Saqultah by fusing the first half of the first word with the second half of the second word, so it became "Saqlath", as mentioned in old calendar books from 1231 AH (Between 1815-1816 AD).
- the 1877 tables of the Ministry of Finance mention it as “Saqlath and the Arabs”.

== See also ==
- List of cities and towns in Egypt
