= El Maragha =

El Maragha ⲧⲁⲗⲙⲁⲣⲁⲅⲉ المراغة
- Town
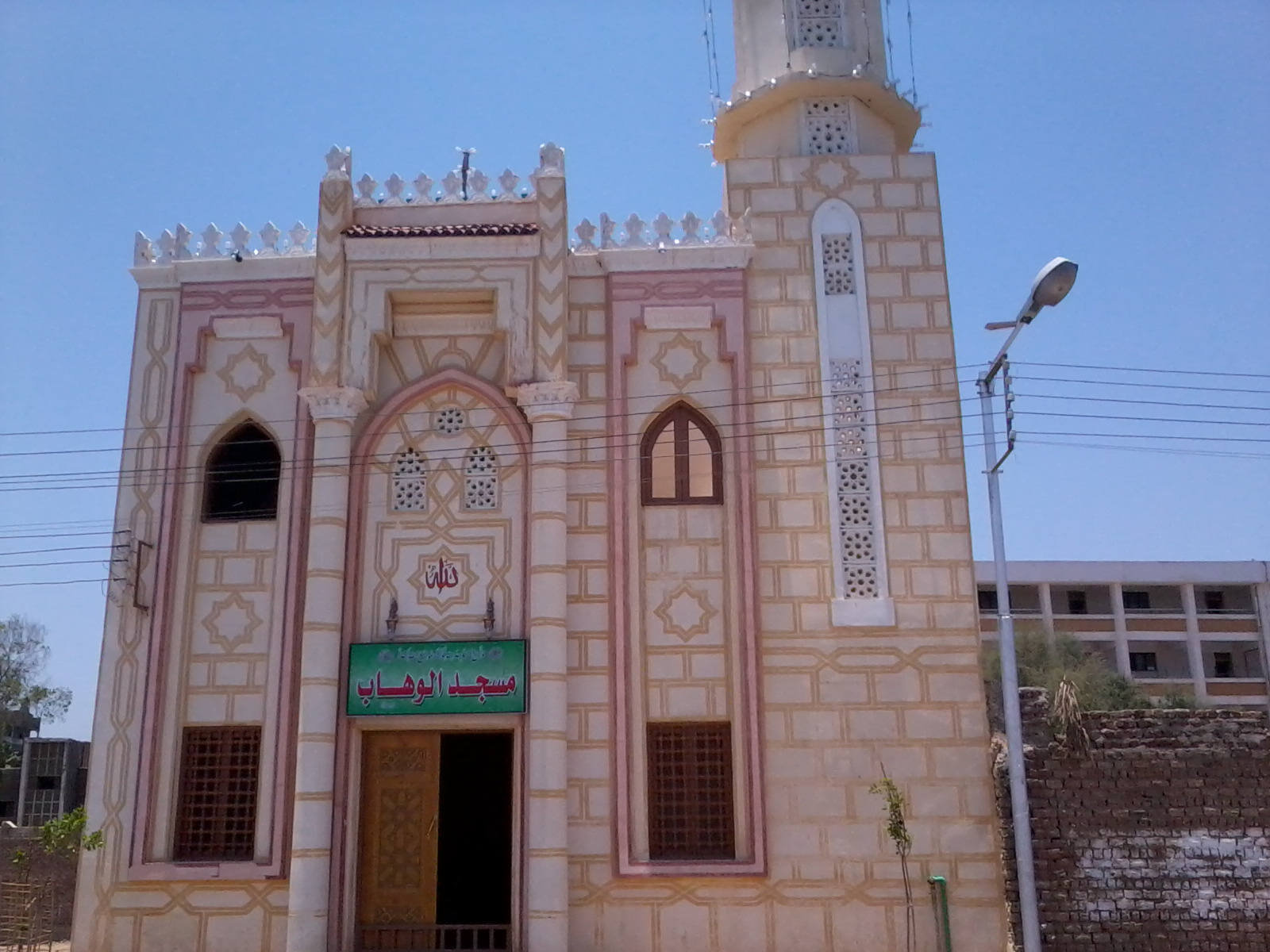
- Al-Wahab mosque in Maragha

- Location in Egypt
- Coordinates: 26°42′N 31°36′E
- Country: Egypt
- Governorate: Sohag

Area
  - Total: 5.33 km^{2} (2.06 sq mi)
- Elevation: 61 m (200 ft)

Population (2023)
  - Total: 55,952
  - Density: 10,500/km^{2} (27,200/sq mi)
- Demonym(s): Maraghi (Male, Arabic: مراغي) Maraghiyah (Female, Arabic: مراغية)
- Time zone: UTC+2 (EET)
  - Summer (DST): UTC+3 (EEST)

El Maragha (Arabic: المراغة, Coptic: ⲧⲁⲗⲙⲁⲣⲁⲅⲉ) is a city in the Sohag Governorate in Upper Egypt. It is located on the west bank of the Nile.

== Etymology ==
The name of the city is a corruption of Arabic: مغارة, romanized: maghara, lit. 'cave'. This claim is also supported by a Coptic translation of this toponym (Coptic: ⲡⲓⲥⲡⲏⲗⲁⲓⲟⲛ or ⲡⲓⲥⲡⲉⲗⲉⲱⲛ, lit. 'cave').

== History ==
El Maragha witnessed many historical events; the most prominent one is the battle of Barrod, in which a French flotilla was captured and its crew were killed on 3 March 1799.

== Notable people ==
- Mustafa al-Maraghi
