= Tima, Egypt =

Tima طما
- City
- Location in Egypt
- Coordinates: 26°55′N 31°26′E
- Country: Egypt
- Governorate: Sohag

Area
  - Total: 148.7 km^{2} (57.4 sq mi)

Population (2021)
  - Total: 471,166
  - Density: 3,169/km^{2} (8,207/sq mi)
- Time zone: UTC+2 (EET)
  - Summer (DST): UTC+3 (EEST)

Tima (Arabic: طما, Coptic: ⲧⲁⲙⲙⲁ) is a city in the Sohag Governorate of Upper Egypt. It is located on the west bank of the Nile.

== See also ==
- List of cities and towns in Egypt
