= Hypselis =

Ancient Egyptian city

- Shashotep
- Location within Egypt
- 27.1440°N 31.2380°E
- Type: Settlement
- Location: Asyut Governorate, Egypt

Hypselis or Hypsela (Ancient Greek: Ύψηλή; Coptic: ϣⲱⲧⲡ), known to the ancient Egyptians as Shashotep, is an ancient Egyptian city and Roman bishopric, which was located near the modern town of Shutb (or ash-Shatb, Chutb) in the Asyut Governorate.

== History ==
=== Antiquity ===
M8 O34 R4 O49 or M8 M17 S29 R4 X1 Q3 X1 O49
šꜣs ḥtp
in hieroglyphs
Era: Middle Kingdom
(2055–1650 BC)

Shashotep is first mentioned in texts dating back to the First Intermediate Period. During the subsequent Middle Kingdom it was the main town of the 11th Upper Egyptian nome. The main deity of ancient Shashotep was Khnum, who was sometimes called "Lord of Shashotep". The cemeteries near the modern place Rifeh, once belonged to the town. Later, the city became known by the Greeks as Hypselis.

=== Titular see ===
During Roman time, and before fading into the desert, the city became one of the suffragan sees of the Metropolitan Archdiocese of Antinoë, capital of the province of Thebais Prima. The diocese was nominally restored in 1933 as Latin Titular bishopric by the names of Hypselis / Ipseli. It is vacant since 1997, following the death of its last bishop, Jesús Serrano Pastor.

== See also ==
- List of ancient Egyptian towns and cities
- List of Catholic dioceses in Egypt
- Apollonopolis Parva (Hypselis)
