= Kom Isfaht =

Kom Isfaht كوم اسفحت
- Town
- Location in Egypt
- Coordinates: 26°56′16″N 31°19′36″E
- Country: Egypt
- Governorate: Asyut
- Time zone: UTC+2 (EET)
  - Summer (DST): UTC+3 (EEST)

Kom Isfaht (Arabic: كوم اسفحت, from Coptic: ⲥⲃⲉϩⲧ)is a town in the Upper Egyptian Asyut Governorate. It is located on the west bank of the Nile. It was a Roman village named Apollonopolites Heptakomias. During the Muslim conquest, it was called kūra of Qahqawa.

== Overview ==
Kom Isfaht is a locality of Asyut, situated 40 minutes distance from Abu Tig, in the district of Abu Tig, in the Asyut Governorate. It has a population of 3,719 inhabitants, with no dependencies.

References elsewhere are to the church of Saint George in Kom Isfaht and to the fact that its name in Roman Egypt was Apollinopolis Heptakomia in the nome, or province, of Apollinopolites Parvus.

The records of a strategos, or general, whose name was Apollonius, of Heptakomia have been preserved. There are a number of letters to Apollonius from his mother, Eudaimonis, and his wife, Aline, when Egypt was away campaigning against the Jews in the great revolt of the Jewish diaspora in Cyrene, Egypt, and Mesopotamia against the Romans and the local populations in 116 and 117 AD. Eudaimonis was very worried about Apollonius' safety, but he seems to have returned unharmed because we also have his application for two months' leave to sort out his affairs, after the end of the revolt, Aline set up an altar to the Dioscuri, Castor and Pollux, in thanksgiving.

There also records of a monastery near Kom Isfaht, the monastery of Apa Apollo at Baouit.

Ref:Dictionnaire Geographique de l’Egypte of 1899 records her Kom Esfaht
