= Ptolemais Hermiou =

Ptolemais Hermiou ⲡⲥⲟⲓ
- Town
- Al-Munsha'āh
- Location in Egypt
- Coordinates: 26°29′N 31°48′E
- Country: Egypt
- Governorate: Sohag

Area
  - Total: 17.7 km^{2} (6.8 sq mi)
- Elevation: 68 m (223 ft)

Population (2023)
  - Total: 95,064
  - Density: 5,370/km^{2} (13,900/sq mi)
- Time zone: UTC+2 (EET)
  - Summer (DST): UTC+3 (EEST)

Ptolemais Hermiou, or Ptolemais in the Thebaid, was a city and metropolitan archbishopric in Greco-Roman Egypt and remains a Catholic titular see.

Today, the city of El Mansha (Arabic: المنشأة)-Bsoi (Coptic: ⲡⲥⲟⲓ) in the Sohag Governorate is located where the ancient city used to be.

== History ==
Ptolemais Hermiou was established on the west bank of the Nile at the site of the Egyptian village of Psoï in the Thinis nome by the Ptolemaic ruler Ptolemy I Soter sometime after 312 BCE. Whether it was intended from the outset to replace Thebes as a political centre is disputed. The name Hermiou could refer to a person called Hermias that could have coordinated the foundation for Ptolemy.

According to Strabo, it was the largest city in the Thebaid, equal to Memphis in size. Together with Naukratis and Alexandria, it was one of only three cities with proper Greek city status. Therefore, it also had its own constitution, an assembly with elected magistrates and judges. Greek settlers to the city were brought over from the Peloponnese and northern Greece. The city housed temples to Greek and Egyptian gods (Zeus, Dionysus, Isis) as well as a cult for the worship of the Ptolemaic Dynasty. There was also a theater and actor's guild present in the city.

== Titular see ==
The provincial capital and hence Metropolitan archdiocese of the Late Roman province of Thebais Secunda, which had faded, was nominally restored as a Latin Metropolitan titular archbishopric in the late 19th century as Ptolemais antea Syis, renamed simply Ptolemais in 1925, Ptolemais in Thebaide in 1933.

It has been vacant for decades, having had the following incumbents of the highest rank :

- Lorenzo Passerini (1892.07.11 – 1901.04.18), later Titular Latin Patriarch of Antioch (1901.04.18 – 1915.12.13)
- Luigi Canali, Franciscans (O.F.M. Obs.) (1901.08.03 – 1905.04.22)
- José Marcondes Homem de Melo (1906.12.06 – 1908.08.09)
- Raffaele Virili (1915.01.14 – 1925.03.09)
- Paolo Giobbe (1925.03.30 – 1958.12.15) (later Cardinal)
- Pietro Parente (1959.10.23 – 1965.12.07) (later Cardinal)
