= Hieracon =

- Per Nemty (al-Atawla)
- Location within Egypt
- 27°14′N 31°13′E
- Cultures: Ancient Egypt
- Location: Egypt
- Region: Asyut Governorate

Per Nemty (pr nmty; House of Nemty), an Ancient Egyptian settlement also known in Greek as Hieracon and at the modern village of al-Atawla, on the right/eastern bank of the Nile River northeast of Assiut (5 km). It was the capital of the 12th Nome of Upper Egypt. The town was centered on the Temple of Nemty, the god Nemty being the ferryman god.

== History ==
=== Old Kingdom ===
In the Old Kingdom, the governors of the 12th nome were buried at Deir el-Gabrawi. The area hosted powerful nomarchs durning the 6th Dynasty.

=== Middle Kingdom ===
A Temple-block from el-Atawla with name of Hotepibre of the early 13th Dynasty is in the Cairo Museum (Temp 25.4.22.3).

=== New Kingdom ===
In the New Kingdom, the temple may have seen some construction with a lintel naming Ahmose I.

=== Hellenistic Period ===
Hieracon or Hierakon (Ἱεράκων κώμη, Ptolemy vi. 7. § 36), also called Theracon, Egyptian pr nmty, was an ancient fortified city of Upper Egypt situated on the right bank of the Nile, now the site of the modern-day village of Elatawlah, Egypt. It stood nearly midway between the western extremity of the Ἀλαβαστρινὸν ὄρος or Alabstrine Mountains (the site of the Kom al-Ahmar Necropolis) and the city of Asyut (Greek Lycopolis), latitude 27° 15′North.

=== Roman Period ===
In Roman times, was quartered the cohors prima of the Lusitanian auxiliaries.

== Similarities ==
Hieracon is distinct from Nekhen (Ἱεράκων πόλις, Hierakon polis Strabo xvii. p. 817), which was south of Thebes, lat. 25° 52′North, nearly opposite Eileithyias polis (Ειλείθυιας πόλις, Egyptian Nekheb, modern El Kab), and capital of the third nome of Upper Egypt.
