= Thebaid =

Administrative region in Aegyptus

Provincia Thebais Θηβαΐς ἐπαρχία Θηβαΐδος
- Province of the Byzantine Empire, Diocese of Egypt
- c. 293 AD–641 AD
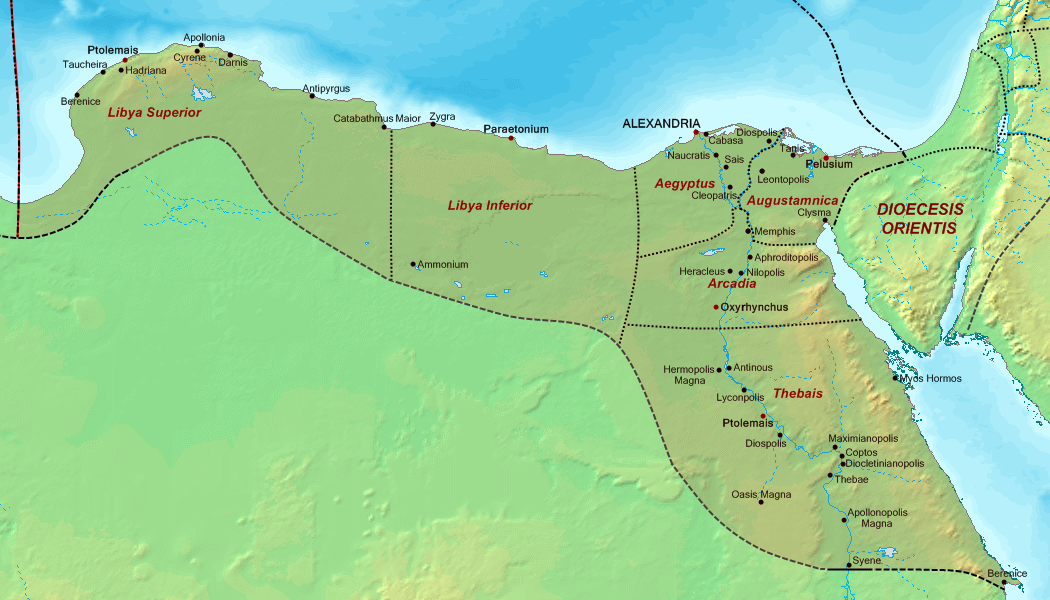
- Map of the late Roman Diocese of Egypt, with Thebais in the south.
- Capital: Ptolemais
- Historical era: Late Antiquity
  - Division by emperor Diocletian: c. 293 AD
  - Persian occupation: 612–628 AD
  - Conquest by Arabs: 641 AD
- Today part of: Egypt

The Thebaid or Thebais (Ancient Greek: Θηβαΐς, Thēbaïs) was a region in ancient Egypt, comprising the 13 southernmost nomes of Upper Egypt, from Abydos to Aswan.

== Pharaonic history ==
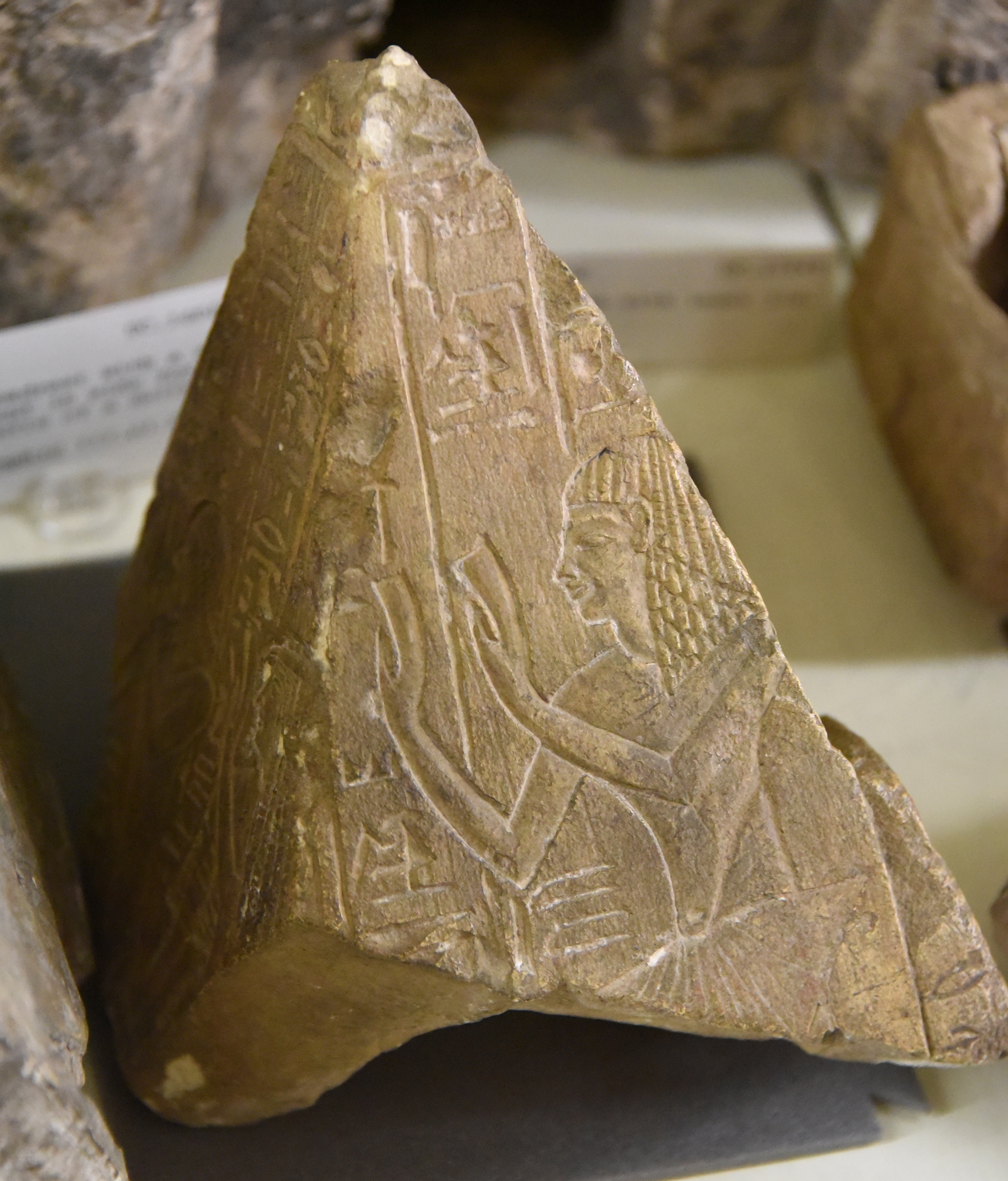
Pyramidion of Nebamun. Possibly top of a stela. Limestone. 19th Dynasty. From Egypt. Bought in the Thebaid (Thebais) but probably it came from Deir el-Medina. The Petrie Museum of Egyptian Archaeology, London

The Thebaid acquired its name from its proximity to the ancient Egyptian capital of Thebes (Luxor). During the Ancient Egyptian dynasties this region was dominated by Thebes and its priesthood at the temple of Amun at Karnak.

In Ptolemaic Egypt, the Thebaid formed a single administrative district under the Epistrategos of Thebes, who was also responsible for overseeing navigation in the Red Sea and the Indian Ocean. The capital of Ptolemaic Thebaid was Ptolemais Hermiou, a Hellenistic colony on the Nile which served as the center of royal political and economic control in Upper Egypt.

== Roman province(s) ==
During the Roman Empire, Diocletian created the province of Thebais, guarded by the legions I Maximiana Thebanorum and II Flavia Constantia. This was later divided into Upper (Latin: Thebais Superior, Greek: Ἄνω Θηβαΐς, Anō Thēbaïs), comprising the southern half with its capital at Thebes, and Lower or Nearer (Latin: Thebais Inferior, Greek: Θηβαΐς Ἐγγίστη, Thēbaïs Engistē), comprising the northern half with capital at Ptolemais.

Around the 5th century, since it was a desert, the Thebaid became a place of retreat of a number of Christian hermits, and was the birthplace of Pachomius. In Christian art, the Thebaid was represented as a place with numerous monks.

== Episcopal sees ==
Ancient episcopal sees of Thebais Prima (Thebaid I) listed in the Annuario Pontificio as Catholic titular sees:

- Antaeopolis (Tjebu)
- Antinoöpolis, the Metropolitan Archbishopric
- Apollonopolis Parva (Côm-Esfaht, now Qus)
- Cusae
- Hermopolis Magna = Maior
- Hypselis (Chutb = Shutb)
- Oasis Magna (Kharga Oasis)
- Panopolis (Akhmim)

Ancient episcopal sees of Thebais Secunda (Thebaid II) listed in the Annuario Pontificio as Catholic titular sees:

- Apollonopolis Magna (Edfu)
- Coptus (Qift)
- Diocletianopolis in Thebaide (Qus)
- Diospolis Superior (Hu)
- Hermonthis
- Latopolis (ancient Esna)
- Maximianopolis in Thebaide (Qena)
- Philae
- Pselchis (Temple of Dakka)
- Ptolemais in Thebaide (Ptolemais Hermiou), the Metropolitan Archbishopric
- Syene (Aswan)
- Tentyris (Dendera)
- Thinis

== Cultural references ==
Anatole France's novel, Thaïs, opens on a monastic and ascetic community along the Nile, in Thebaid.

== See also ==
- List of Catholic dioceses in Egypt

== Sources and external links ==
- Bagnall, R., J. Drinkwater, A. Esmonde-Cleary, W. Harris, R. Knapp, S. Mitchell, S. Parker, C. Wells, J. Wilkes, R. Talbert, M. E. Downs, M. Joann McDaniel, B. Z. Lund, T. Elliott, S. Gillies (15 February 2012). "Places: 991398 (Thebais)". Pleiades.
- GCatholic - (Current, Titular and) Defunct sees in Egypt
