= El Balyana =

El Balyana ⲃⲩⲗⲓⲁⲛⲏ ⲧⲡⲟⲗⲩⲃⲓⲁⲛⲏ البلينا
- Town

- Location in Egypt
- Coordinates: 26°14′N 32°0′E
- Country: Egypt
- Governorate: Sohag

Area
  - Total: 4.99 km^{2} (1.93 sq mi)
- Elevation: 75 m (246 ft)

Population (2023)
  - Total: 71,353
  - Density: 14,300/km^{2} (37,000/sq mi)
- Time zone: UTC+2 (EET)
  - Summer (DST): UTC+3 (EEST)

El Balyana (Arabic: البلينا; Coptic: ⲃⲩⲗⲓⲁⲛⲏ, ⲧⲡⲟⲗⲩⲃⲓⲁⲛⲏ Tpolubianē, Coptic pronunciation: [təpoliβjˈanə]) is a town in the Sohag Governorate of Upper Egypt. Located on the west bank of the Nile, it is situated near the ancient Egyptian city of Abydos.

== History ==
The modern city name comes from a Coptic distortion of a Greek name Polybius (Ancient Greek: Πολύβιος). El Balyana was formerly a village belonging to the city of Bardes or the region of Bardes and then at the beginning of the last century was transferred to the center of the town of Balyana and became Bardes, a village belonging to the city of Balyana.

== See also ==
- List of cities and towns in Egypt
