= Qaw el-Kebir =

Qaw el-Kebir ⲧⲕⲱⲟⲩ ⲧⲕⲟⲟⲩ قاو الكبير
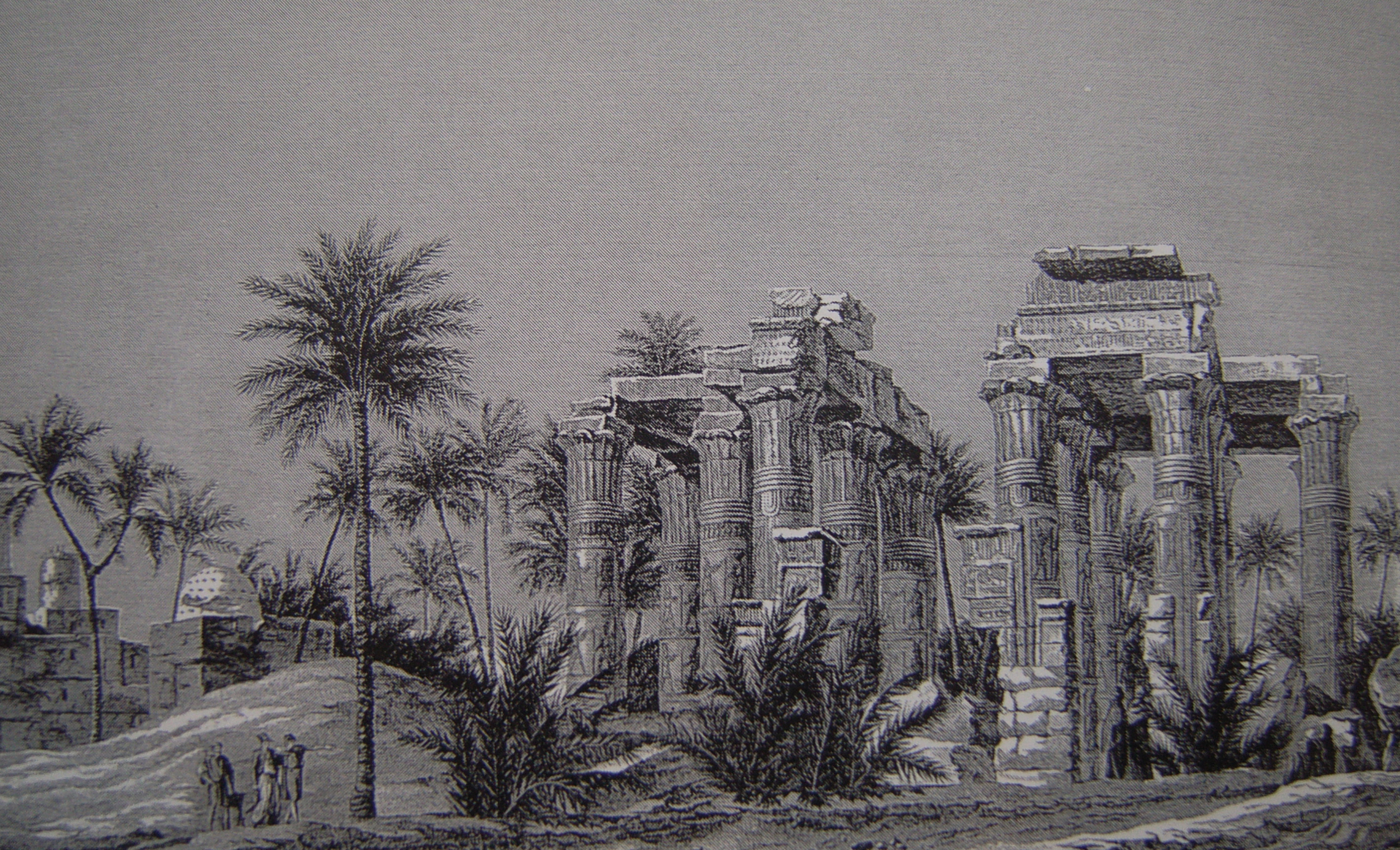
- The Ptolemaic temple of Antaepolis in the early 1800s, from the Description de l'Égypte
- Nickname: العتمانية
- Location in Egypt
- Coordinates: 26°54′N 31°31′E
- Country: Egypt
- Governorate: Asyut
- Time zone: UTC+2 (EET)
  - Summer (DST): UTC+3 (EEST)

Qaw el-Kebir (Arabic: قاو الكبير) or El Etmannyieh (Arabic: العتمانية) is a village in the Asyut Governorate of Egypt. An old settlement, it was known in Ancient Egypt as Tjebu or Tkow (Coptic: ⲧⲕⲱⲟⲩ, Ancient Egyptian: Ḏw-qȝw, lit. 'high mountain'). In Greek and Roman Egypt, its name was Antaeopolis (Ancient Greek: Ἀνταίου πόλις) after its tutelary deity, the war god known by the Hellenized name Antaeus.

== History ==
=== Middle Kingdom ===
Dw q A28 t niwt
ḏw ḳꜣ(t)
in hieroglyphs

Several large terraced funerary complexes in Tjebu by officials of the 10th nome during the Twelfth and Thirteenth dynasties represent the peak of non-royal funerary architecture of the Middle Kingdom. Cemeteries of different dates were also found in the area.

=== New Kingdom ===
The tomb of the local governor May dates to the New Kingdom.

=== Ptolemaic temple ===
A Ptolemaic temple of Ptolemy IV Philopator, enlarged and restored under Ptolemy VI Philometor and Marcus Aurelius, was destroyed in the early nineteenth century.

Tb Tb W W niwt
ṯbw
in hieroglyphs
Era: 2nd Intermediate Period
(1650–1550 BC)

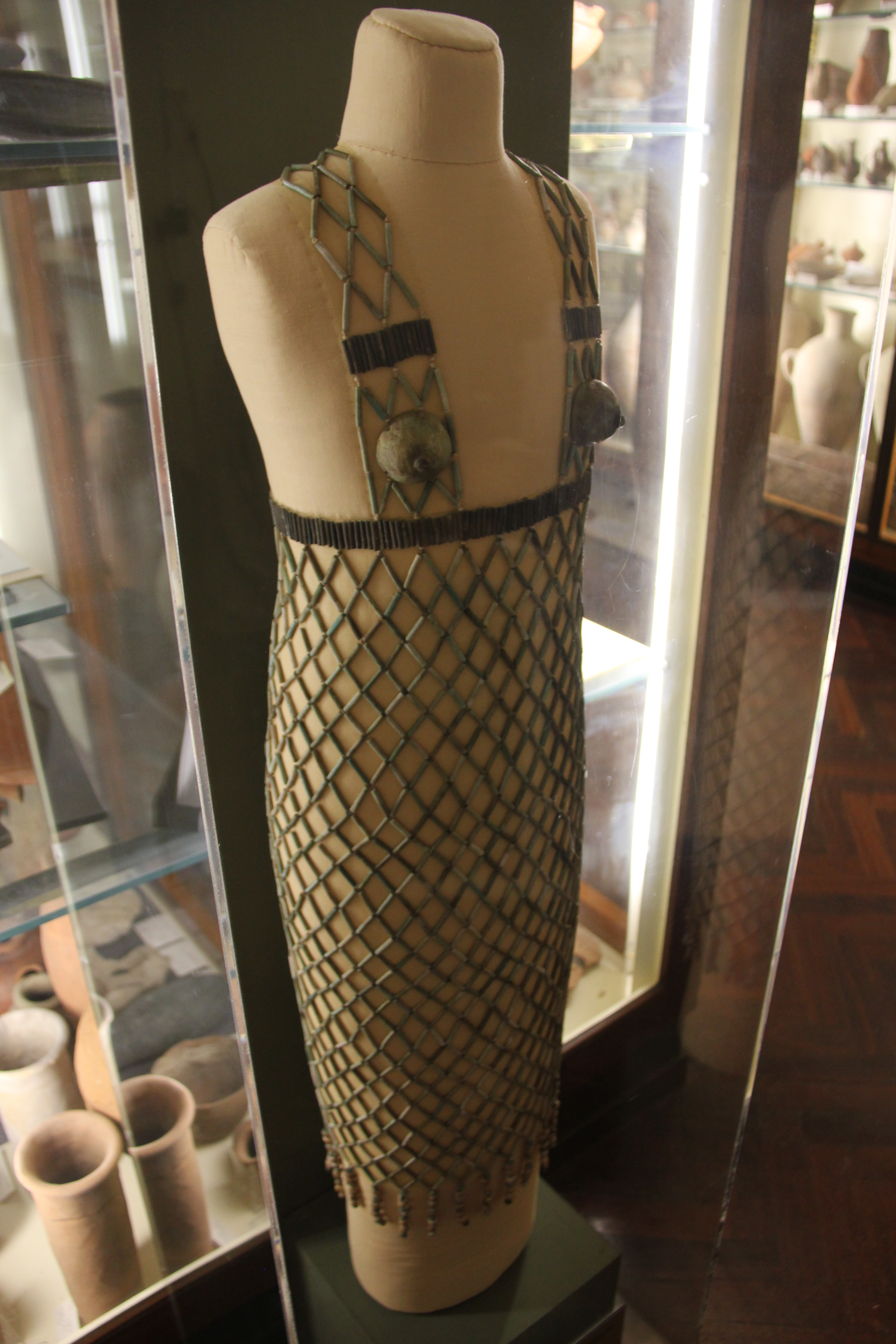
Bead net dress (UC17743) excavated in 1923–24 from the site, Petrie Museum.

The temple in this town was large, comparatively speaking—an 18-column pronaos, with a twelve-column hypostyle hall preceding the vestibule hall, the inner sanctum, and two flanking chambers of equal size.

=== Fusion of Seth and Horus ===
The edifice was dedicated primarily to "Antaeus", who represented a warrior fusion of Seth and Horus. This deity's name is written with an obscure hieroglyph (G7a or G7b in the standard Gardiner list), which gives no clue as to the pronunciation. Modern Egyptologists read the name as Nemtiwey.

=== Cult of Nephthys ===
Nephthys was the primary goddess who received worship in this temple, or perhaps in an adjunct shrine of her own, as the corresponding female power of Nemtiwey. A Prophet of Nephthys is attested for Tjebu. In cliffside quarries not far from the ancient site, visitors can see notable reliefs of both Antaeus and Nephthys. At the same time, the site has again drawn most of its interest since 19th- and early 20th-century archaeologists have studied the maze of relatively well-preserved tombs in the district.

Statue of Governor Wahka, born of Neferhotep, from Qaw el-Kebir, between 1976 and 1794 BC. (Middle Kingdom). Museo Egizio, Turin.

== See also ==
- List of ancient Egyptian towns and cities

== Sources ==
- Gauthier, Henri (1929). Dictionnaire des Noms Géographiques Contenus dans les Textes Hiéroglyphiques Vol. 6.
- Ilin-Tomich, Alexander (2018). "The Governor's Court in Late Middle Kingdom Antaeopolis". Revue d'Égyptologie. 68: 61–78. doi:10.2143/RE.68.0.3285267.
- Pfeiffer, Stefan (2015). Griechische und lateinische Inschriften zum Ptolemäerreich und zur römischen Provinz Aegyptus. Einführungen und Quellentexte zur Ägyptologie (in German). Vol. 9. Münster: Lit. pp. 126–128.
