= Apollonopolis Parva (Hypselis) =

Town in Ptolemaic Egypt

Apollonopolis Parva or Apollinopolis Parva (Ancient Greek: Ἀπόλλωνος ἡ μικρά, Steph. B. s. v.; Ἀπόλλων μικρός, Hierocl. p. 731) or Apollonos minoris [urbs] (It. Anton. p. 158), was an ancient town in Upper Egypt, in latitude 27° North, upon the western bank of the Nile. It stood between Hypselis (Hypsela) and Lycopolis, and belonged to the Hypseliote nome.
