= Coptic Orthodox Church in Wales =

The Coptic Orthodox Church in Wales consists of the Coptic Orthodox presence in Wales.

== Historical background ==
=== Missionary work of the Church of Alexandria ===
The ecclesiastical history of the Church of Alexandria records that the church sent missionaries, especially monastics, to the Celtic lands in the 3rd or 4th century.

Celtic tradition, especially in Ireland, suggests that the foundation of the monastic system among the Celts either partly imitated or took inspiration from the Egyptian monastic system, and that traces of Alexandrine theology remain embedded in Celtic theology. Thus both Coptic Christians and Celts can see the return of the Church of Alexandria to Celtia as of significance.

=== Modern presence ===
Although the Coptic Orthodox congregation has been present in Wales since the 1960s, the first Coptic Orthodox Church in Wales was consecrated in 1992 by Pope Shenouda III of Alexandria in the town of Risca, South Wales.

Currently there are two Coptic Orthodox churches in Wales.

== St Mary and St Mercurius Coptic Orthodox Church ==
Reverend Father Philopater Mouris Wahba, the Priest of St Mary’s and St Abu Saifain’s Coptic Orthodox Church in the town of Risca, South Wales.

The first Coptic Orthodox Church in Wales was consecrated in 1992 by Pope Shenouda III of Alexandria in the town of Risca, Newport, South Wales, as a church of the Coptic Orthodox Church of Alexandria. The official name of the church is St Mary's and St Abu Saifain's Coptic Orthodox Church.

The current priest is Father Philopater Wahba.

This church was under the direct supervision of Pope Shenouda III of Alexandria and he was the head of the Church's council.

== St Mary and St Abasikhyron Coptic Orthodox Church ==
The second Coptic Orthodox Church in Llandudno, Wales was bought by the Coptic Orthodox Diocese of the Midlands in 2005 under the supervision of Bishop Missael as Coptic Orthodox services began there later that year.

At first the church did not have its own priest, therefore the mass was held there on Saturdays by a visiting priest, Father Bishoy, from the Coptic Orthodox Church in Manchester. Later the church had its own priest, Fr. John Saleeb.

The church was consecrated by Pope Shenouda III during a visit to the UK on Saturday 29 March 2008.

== See also ==
- Coptic Orthodox Church of Alexandria
- Coptic Orthodox Diocese of the Midlands and Affiliated Areas U.K.
- St Mary and St Mercurius Coptic Orthodox Church
- Copts
- Patriarch of Alexandria
- Coptic Orthodox Church in Britain and Ireland
- The Holy Synod of the Coptic Orthodox Church
- Oriental Orthodoxy
- Egypt
