= Coptic Orthodox Church in Great Britain and Ireland =

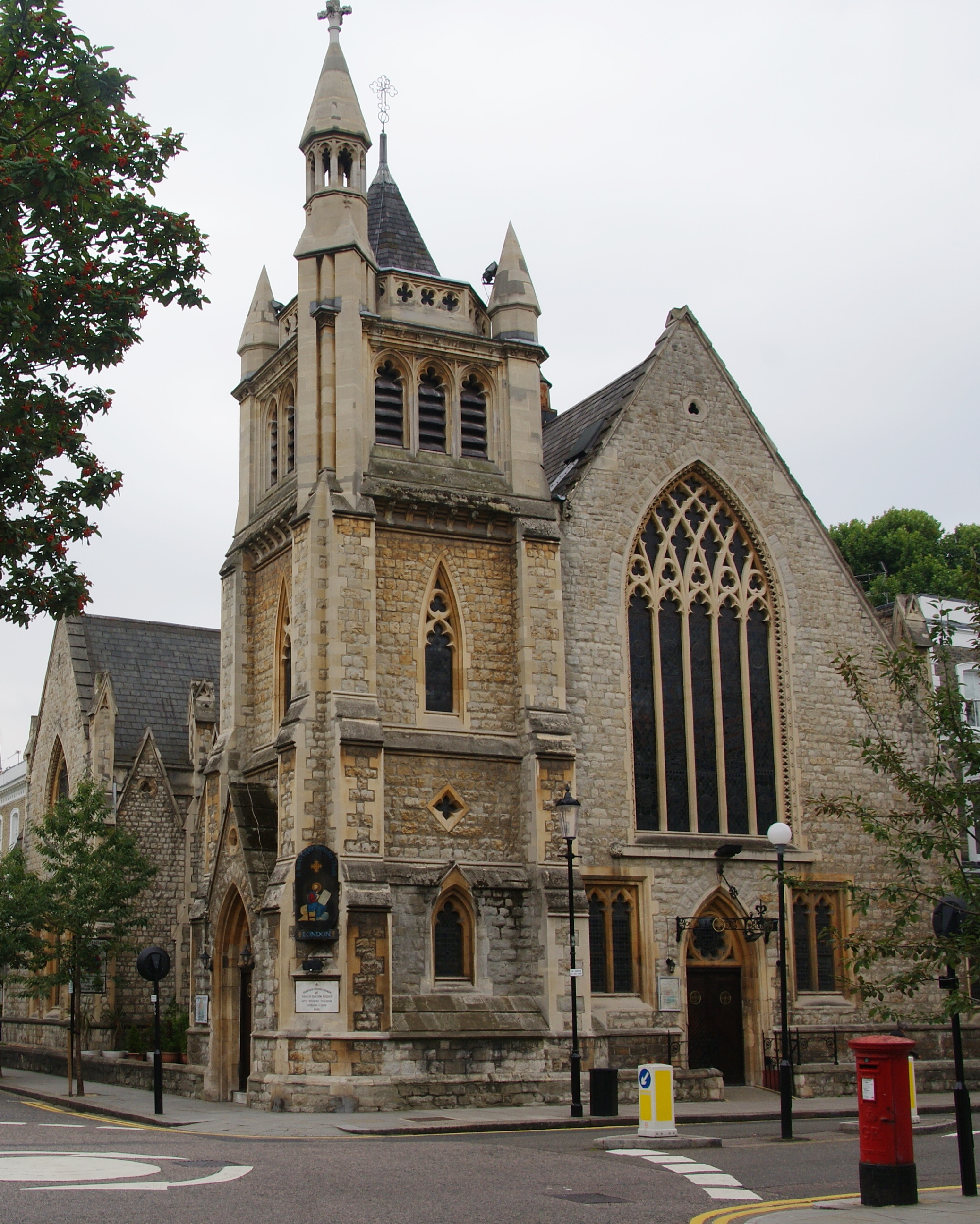
The Coptic Church of St Mark in Kensington, London, opened in 1863 at St John's Presbyterian Church, reconsecrated as a Coptic Orthodox church in 1979.

The Coptic Orthodox Church of Alexandria has several churches in Great Britain and Ireland under the jurisdiction of four diocesan bishops.

The first liturgical service prayed in the British Isles took place in London on 10 August 1954, officiated by delegates attending the general assembly of the World Council of Churches. The foundation of the church and its establishment of a parish started with a liturgical service held in London in February 1969, prayed by the Bishop of Christian Education, Shenouda (later Pope Shenouda III of Alexandria, the 117th pope of the church). Regular services only began in 1971 when the first resident Coptic priest, Father Antuniyus al-Suryani (later Metropolitan Pachomius of Beheira), celebrated the Divine Liturgy at St Andrew's Church, Holborn, London. In 1976, the church council purchased a building in Kensington, establishing the Coptic Orthodox parish of St Mark; this was served by three monastic priests, who later on became members of the Holy Synod of the mother church in Egypt. Pope Shenouda III consecrated St Mark's Coptic Orthodox Church in Kensington, London in 1979.

By 1981, other communities had been established around Britain and Ireland, with regular services at which visiting priests officiated, including Fr Bishoy Boshra and Fr Antonious Thabet. In April 1985, St Mary and St Antony's Coptic Orthodox Church in Birmingham was consecrated by the first resident bishop sent to Britain, Bishop Missael, making it the second church to be established in England and the first outside London.

Following the establishment of St Mary and St Mark's Coptic Orthodox Centre in Birmingham, Bishop Missael was consecrated on 26 May 1991 by Pope Shenouda III as the first bishop of the first Coptic Orthodox diocese in the British Isles, the Diocese of Birmingham, which became the Diocese of the Midlands. In 1995, Bishop Antony was consecrated with the formation of the Diocese of Ireland, Scotland, North East England and its Affiliated Regions. Fr Angaelos Anba Bishoy (now Bishop Angaelos) of Archangel Michael and St Anthony Coptic Centre in Stevenage was consecrated in 1999 as a general bishop and patriarchal exarch for youth ministry at the Patriarchal Centre and the Coptic Orthodox Theological College.

The Coptic Orthodox Church and congregation has continued to grow and expand in various parts of Britain and Ireland.

== Coptic Orthodox Diocese of the Midlands ==
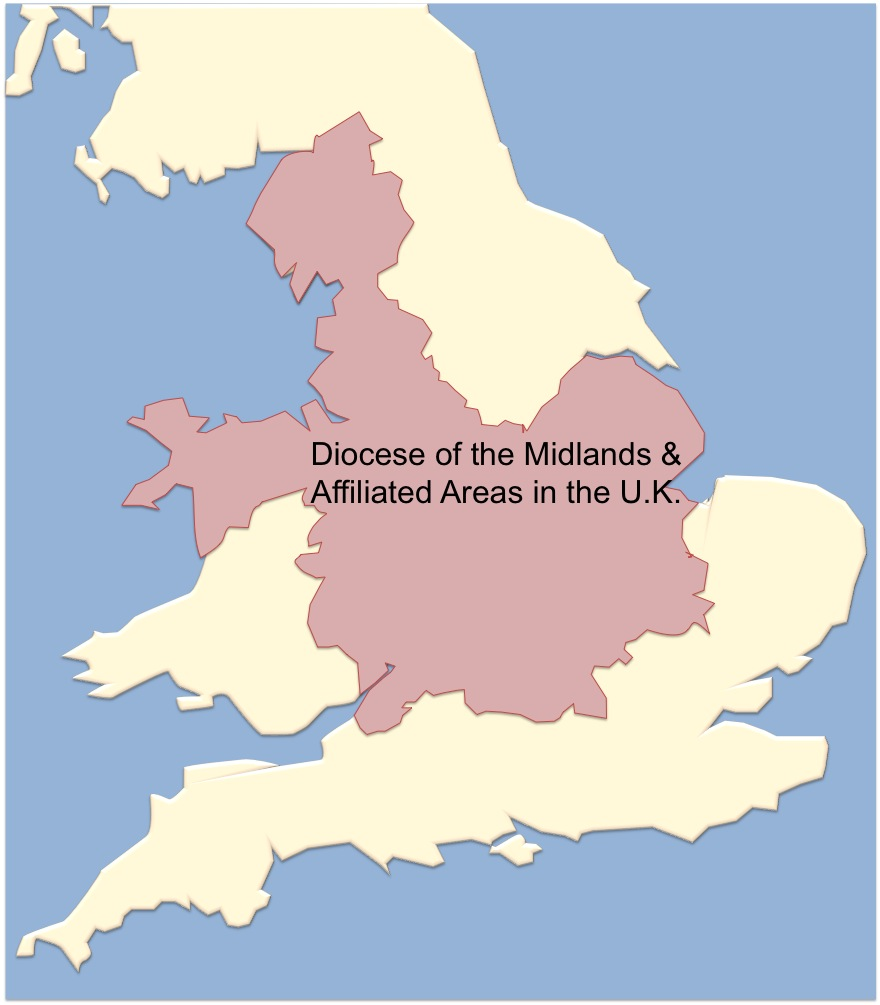
Coptic Orthodox Diocese of the Midlands, U.K.

Bishop Missael is the bishop of the Holy Diocese of the Midlands. The diocese was established in 1991 by Pope Shenouda III, making it the oldest diocese in the United Kingdom for the Coptic Orthodox Patriarchate. The diocese is currently based at the Coptic Orthodox Centre in Lapworth, Warwickshire, where Bishop Missael resides. Its territories include North Wales and the English regions: West Midlands, East Midlands, North West and parts of the South East, South West and East of England.

== Coptic Orthodox Diocese of Ireland, Scotland, North East England and its Affiliated Regions ==
Bishop Antony, has served as bishop of the Diocese of Ireland, Scotland and North East England. The diocese was established in 1995.

== Coptic Orthodox Diocese of London ==
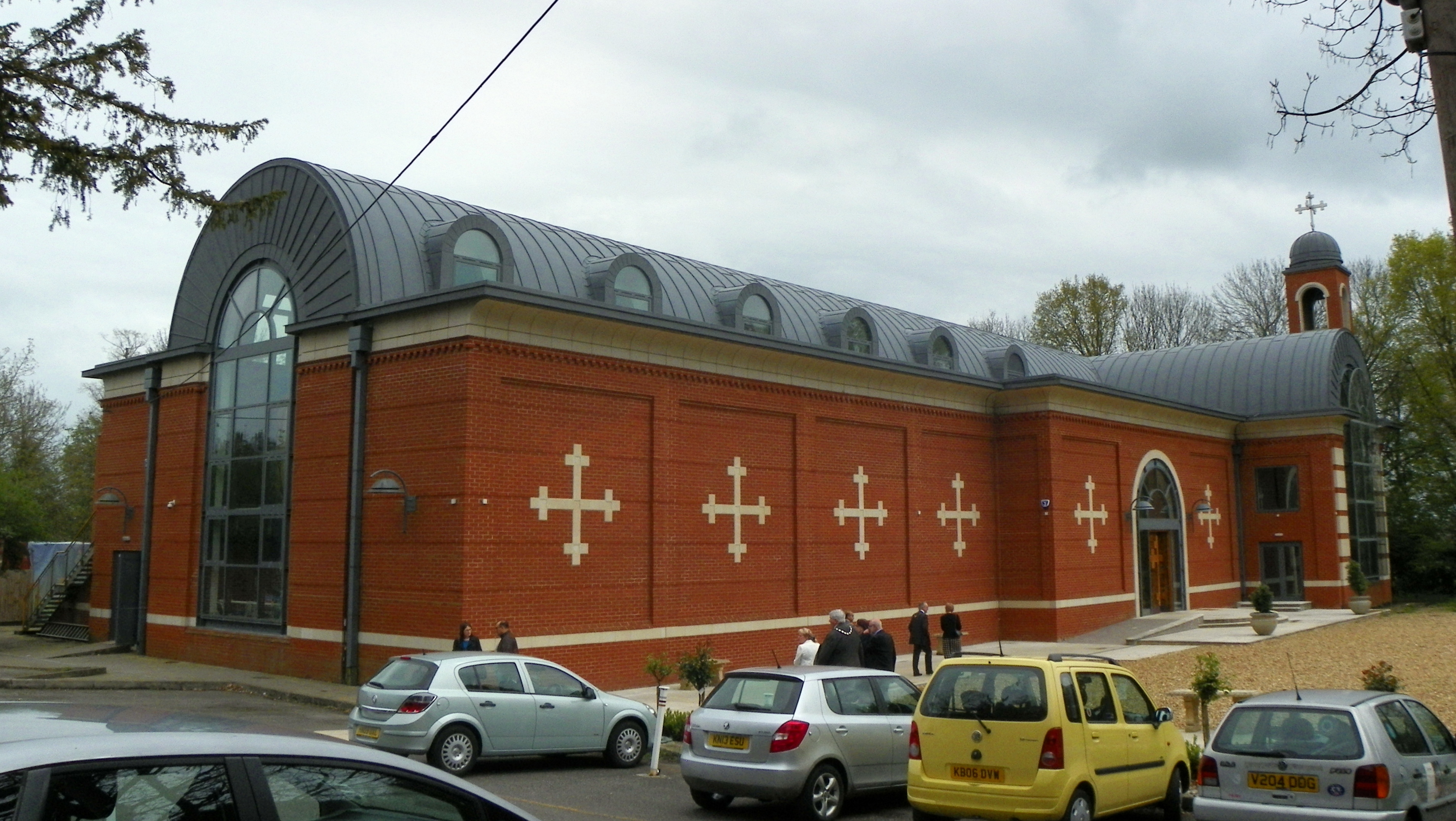
St George's Coptic Orthodox Cathedral, Stevenage

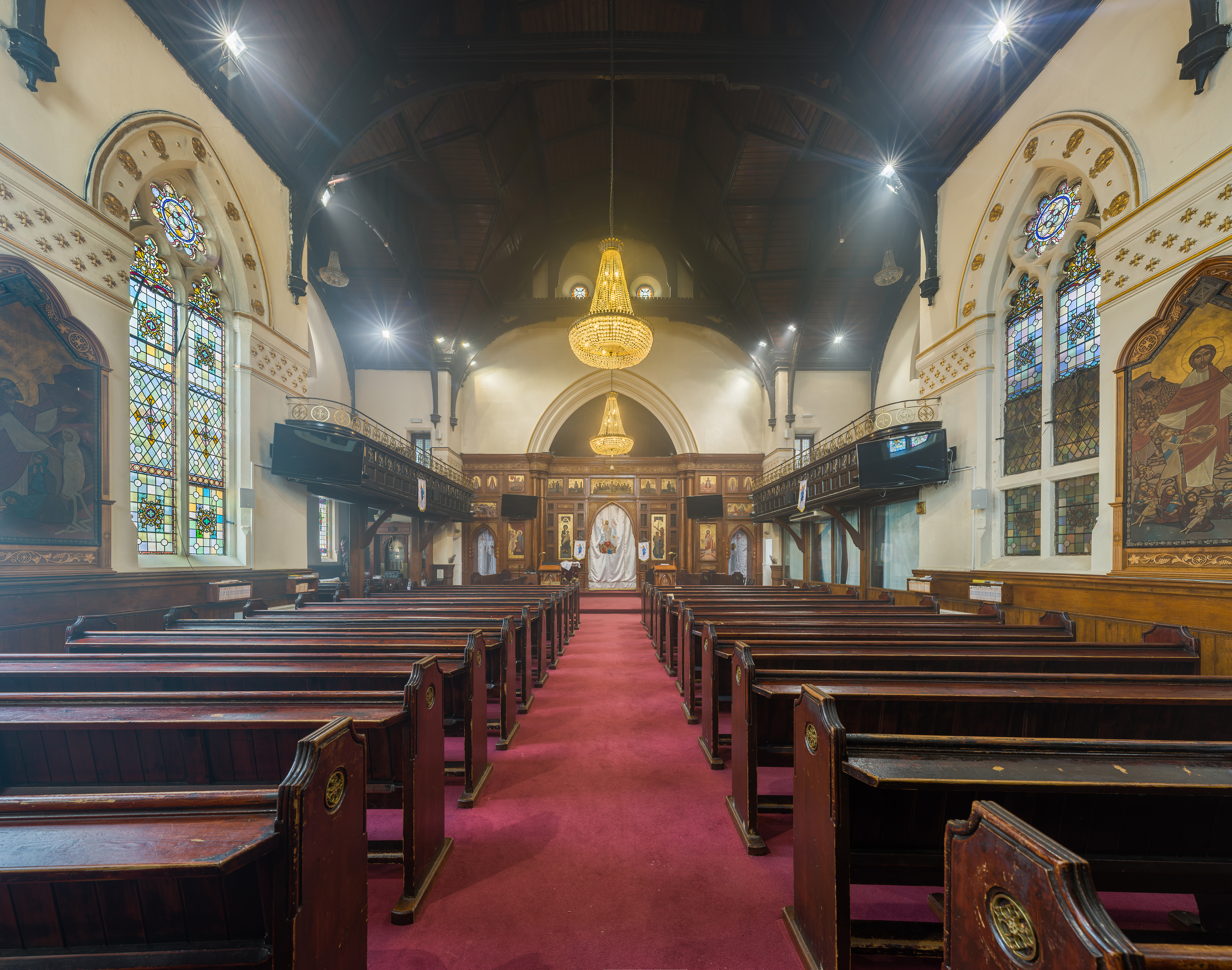
The interior of St Mark's Coptic Orthodox Church, London

Bishop Angaelos OBE, served as bishop of the Holy Diocese of London and Patriarchal Exarch. The diocese was established in 2017 by Pope Tawadros II of Alexandria and is currently based at St George's Coptic Orthodox Cathedral in Stevenage, the seat of the bishop.

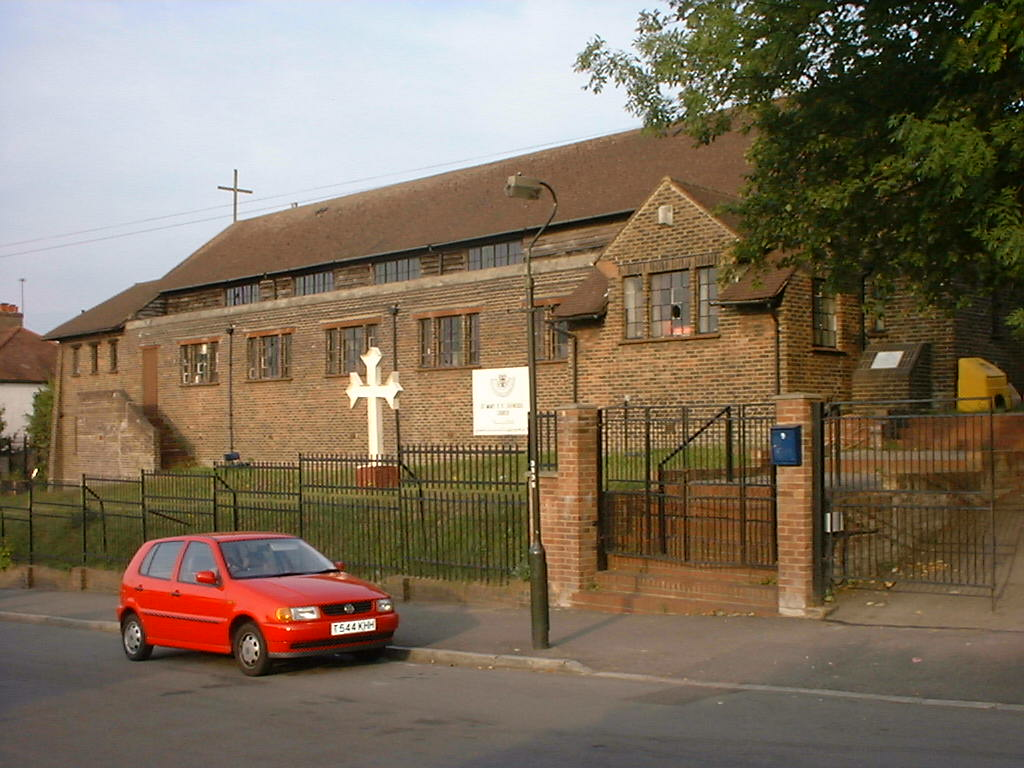
St Mary and St Shenouda's Coptic Orthodox Church, Coulsdon, London

== Sussex ==
These churches are currently under the supervision of Bishop Paula, diocesan bishop of Tanta, since he is currently the head of the parish's council.

- St Mary and St Abraam Coptic Orthodox Church, Hove
- St Demiana and St Pope Kyrillos VI Coptic Orthodox Church, Worthing

== South West Wales ==
- Archangel Michael and St Mina Coptic Orthodox Church, Swansea. This church is under patriarchal supervision of Pope Tawadros II of Alexandria since he is currently the head of the Parish's Council.

== See also ==
- Coptic Orthodox Church in Europe
- Coptic Orthodox Diocese of the Midlands, U.K.
- Copts – ethnoreligious group
- Oriental Orthodoxy
- Coptic Orthodox Church in Wales
- Saint Mary & Saint Philopateer Abu Saifain Coptic Orthodox Church, Risca, South Wales
- St Mary and St Abraam Coptic Orthodox Church, Hove, East Sussex, England
- Bishop Missael
- Anba Angaelos
- British Orthodox Church
- Coptic diaspora
