= Diocese of Birmingham =

Diocese of Birmingham may refer to:

In England and Wales:

- Anglican Diocese of Birmingham
- Coptic Orthodox Diocese of the Midlands and Affiliated Areas U.K., previously titled Diocese of Birmingham
- Roman Catholic Archdiocese of Birmingham, previously a Diocese until 1911

In the United States:

- Roman Catholic Diocese of Birmingham in Alabama
