= Archbishop of London =

Archbishop of London may refer to:

- Archbishop of Southwark, head of the Roman Catholic Archdiocese of Southwark, London
- Archbishop of Westminster, head of the Roman Catholic Diocese of Westminster, London
- Coptic Orthodox Archbishop of London, a leader in the Coptic Orthodox Church in Britain and Ireland
- Bishop of London, Church of England bishop sometimes mistakenly referred to as an archbishop

== See also ==
- Archbishop of Canterbury, principal leader of the Church of England
- The legendary Archbishop of London associated with St Peter upon Cornhill
