= St Mark's Coptic Orthodox Church, London =

St Mark's Coptic Orthodox Church
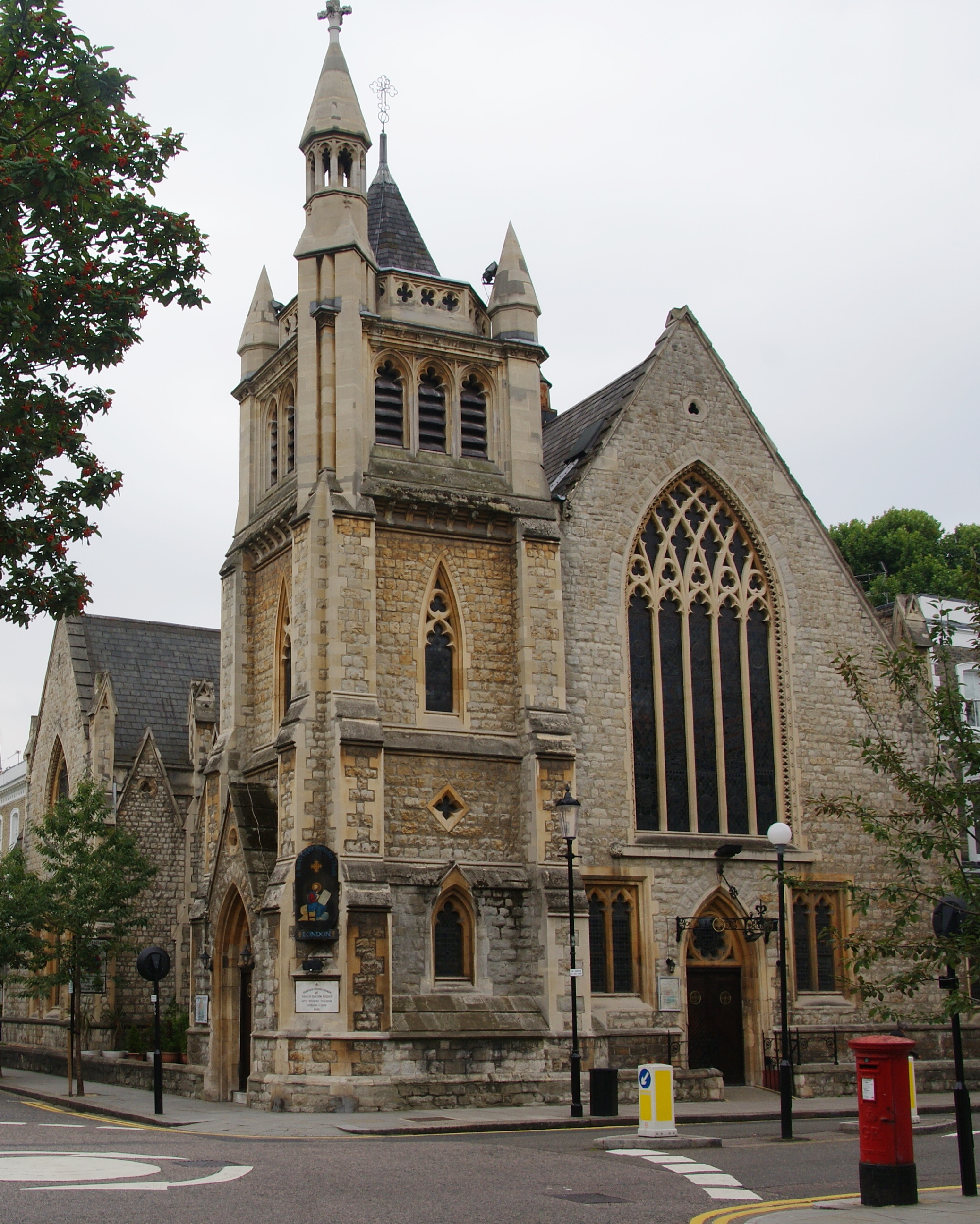
- St Mark's Coptic Orthodox Church
- 51°29′50″N 0°11′40″W
- Location: Kensington, London
- Country: England
- Language(s): Egyptian Arabic & English
- Denomination: Coptic Orthodox Church
- Website: stmark.org.uk

History
- Status: Parish Church
- Dedication: Saint Mark
- Dedicated: 1863 (as Presbyterian church); 1979 (as Coptic Orthodox church)

Architecture
- Functional status: Active
- Style: Victorian Gothic
- Completed: 1863

Administration
- Diocese: Coptic Orthodox Diocese of London

Clergy
- Bishop: Anba Angaelos

St Mark's Coptic Orthodox Church is a church in Kensington, London, located at the south-west corner of the intersection of Allen Street and Scarsdale Villas. It is dedicated to the founder of the Church of Alexandria, Mark the Evangelist. It should not be confused with an Anglican church of the same name in Kennington, also in London. The building was previously St John's Presbyterian Church and was opened in 1863.

Purchased from the Scottish Presbyterian church in 1975, St Mark's was the first Coptic Orthodox church in Europe. It was the seed church of the Coptic Orthodox Church in Britain and Ireland, first served by three hieromonks who later became members of the Holy Synod of the Coptic Orthodox Church. Services are conducted in both English and Arabic.

The exterior of the church has remained almost unchanged since its construction in 1862–1863 in the Victorian Gothic style. However, the interior has changed significantly since then: in the 19th century to address aesthetic and practical issues apparent after the initial construction, involving several architects in the changes, and in the 20th century with its conversion to a Coptic Orthodox church. As part of the conversion, it was the first church outside Egypt to display Neo-Coptic iconography.

== History ==
=== Construction (1862–1863) ===
The construction of the church building originated in a suggestion made by the minister of the Regent Square church to the Reverend Gavin Carlyle, a nephew of Edward Irving, that Carlyle should travel from Edinburgh to preach in London. Tenders for the construction were accepted in July 1862, and in December the trustees accepted a 99-year lease at the site. The architect, J. M. McCulloch, and the builders, R. and A. M. Greig, quoted a price of £3,368, but costs eventually rose to £6,000 as the church was opened in May 1863.

=== As a Scottish Presbyterian church (1863–1975) ===
After the initial construction was completed, there were practical problems and aesthetic discontent with the interior of the church. A visitor to the church remarked:

a feeling of disappointment it is impossible to repress ensues. The interior in no way accords with the idea conveyed by the outside inspection. It is roofed in one span, and heavily ceiled and panelled, producing a sense of depression. The walls are simply bare plaster, the pulpit very large and heavy, the pewing poor and plain. A northern gallery, evidently intended for an organ, is organless, and not much improved by large curtains.

To attempt to address these issues, alterations were soon begun. In 1866–1867, advice was sought from J. J. Stevenson about acoustical matters, and in particular the design of the pulpit. An architect, J. Theodore Barker, made large charges between 1876–1880 and 1882. A chancel arch was inserted, galleries inserted at either end of the transept to increase the seating from 500 to 750. A missing organ was supplied and the pulpit replaced. The heating apparatus and stained glass were also replaced in the work.

The last service of the Presbyterian church was held in October 1975. The congregation joined the former Congregational Kensington Chapel further up Allen Street, within the Kensington United Reformed Church.

=== As a Coptic Orthodox church (1975–present) ===
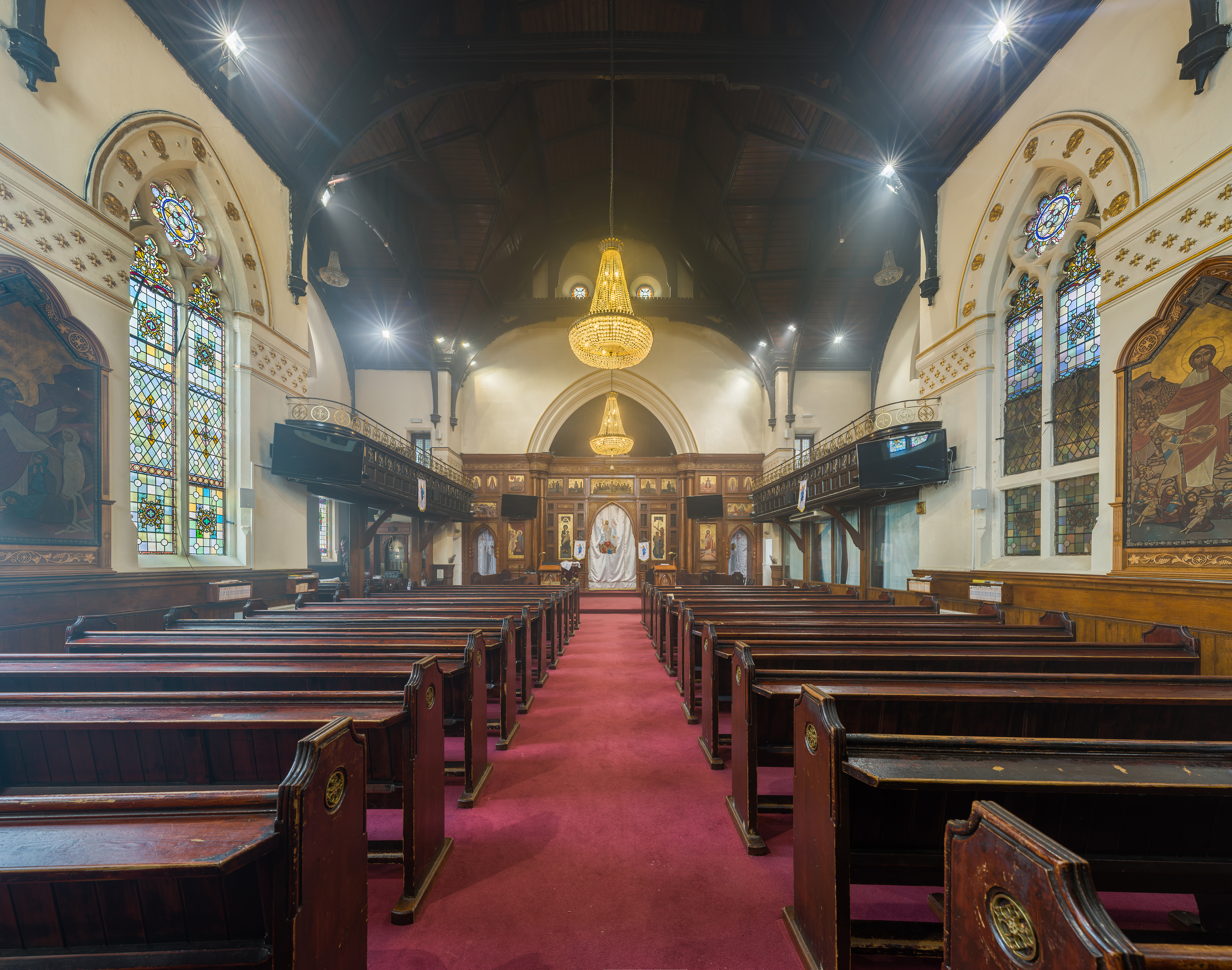
The nave of the church in 2015

In 1975 St John's was sold to the Coptic Orthodox Church and has been home to the congregation of St Mark's ever since. The church was consecrated by Pope Shenouda III of Alexandria in 1979, as the first Coptic church in Europe.

== Ministry and functions ==
A single holy liturgy is held each morning from Tuesday to Saturday, with two Sunday liturgies, one in Arabic and one in English.

== Description ==
The church is built in the Victorian Gothic style.

=== Exterior ===
Externally the church stands about the same as when it was first constructed in 1863.

=== Interior ===
==== Iconography ====
St Mark's was the first church outside of Egypt to display Neo-Coptic iconography. There are two stained glass windows, and a cycle of narrative icons, including a very large icon depicting the martyrdom of Saint Mark.

== See also ==
- Alexandrian Liturgical rites
- Christianity in Egypt
- Coptic literature
- Coptic Orthodox Church in Britain and Ireland
- Coptic philosophy
