= Saint Mary & Saint Philopateer Abu Saifain Coptic Orthodox Church =

Coordinates: 51.6146°N 3.1053°W

St Mary and St Mercurius Coptic Orthodox Church is the first Coptic Orthodox Church in Wales, at St Mary Street in Risca, Newport, Wales.

It was consecrated in 1992 by Pope Shenouda III in the town of Risca, South Wales, under the official name of St Mary’s and St Abu Saifain’s Coptic Orthodox Church as a parish of the Coptic Orthodox Church. St Abu Saifain, meaning "the double-sworded" in Arabic, is another name of Saint Mercurius.

== Priests ==
Reverend Father Philopater Wahba in the church

The current priest is Rev. Fr. Philopater Wahba, who has a degree in medicine (MBBS) and was a consultant in orthopaedic surgery in Egypt. During his work, he graduated from the Coptic Orthodox Theological University in Cairo and from the Institution of Pastoral Care. He was ordained in Egypt in 1996 by Pope Shenouda III, Pope of Alexandria and Patriarch on the Holy See of St Mark, and was given the name Philopater after St Philopater Mercurius who is also known as St Abu Saifain.

== History of the building ==
The church building was a former Wesleyan Methodist church. Founded in 1837, it was rebuilt on the same site in 1852 and was dedicated to St John. The architect is unknown. The church was designed to seat 600 people. It was later known as "Trinity Methodist Church". The church is a Grade II listed building.

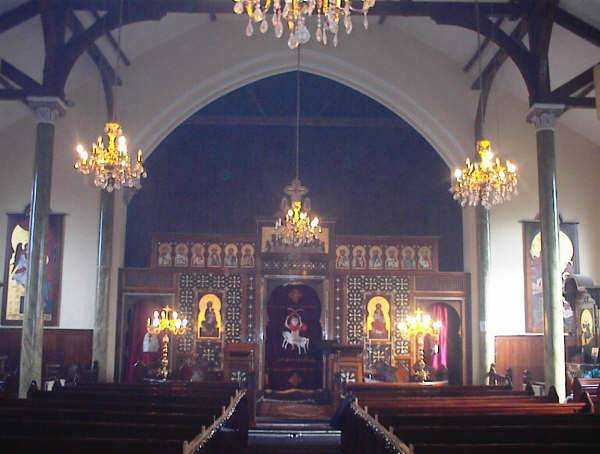
Interior of the church
