= George Habib Bebawi =

American theologian (1938–2021)

George Habib Bebawi (November 27, 1938 — February 4, 2021) was a Coptic Egyptian-American theologian, Biblical scholar and Patristics scholar.

== Career ==
Bebawi studied at the Coptic Orthodox Theological College in Cairo and graduated in 1961, and went on a scholarship to United Kingdom where he studied Theology, Patristics, and Biblical criticism and received his MLitt and PhD in 1970 from University of Cambridge. He taught Theology, Patristics, Church history and Islamic studies in Egypt, Lebanon, England and United States. After serving as advisor for Christian Affairs to Egyptian President Anwar Sadat until his assassination in 1981, Bebawi served as director of the Red Cross in Beirut during the First Lebanon war in 1982. Bebawi taught at St John's College, Nottingham from 1984 to 2000, and held office of director of studies at Institute for Orthodox Christian Studies, Cambridge from 2000 to 2002, where he lectured on Islam and Judaism for Cambridge Theological Federation.

== Controversy and disputes with Pope Shenouda III ==
Bebawi was known for publicly criticizing Coptic Pope Shenouda III, who according to Bebawi attacked the theology of Theosis along with Metropolitan Bishoi (then Secretary of the Holy Synod of the Coptic Orthodox Church) during the unofficial dialogue with the Russian Orthodox Church, claiming the theology to be heretical. While it is seen by some Orthodox researchers that the dispute between Bebawi and Pope Shenouda was over Bebawi's criticizing Pope Shenouda's stand against then Egyptian president Anwar Sadat. Bebawi was excommunicated following a ruling from the Coptic Orthodox Church that was issued after an emergency session held by the Holy Synod in 2007, which was ruled against by the Egyptian Administrative Court in 2011. In 2020, Pope Tawadros II annulled the excommunication of Bebawi despite protests from Anba Raphael, Bishop of Central Cairo, demanding Bebawi write an official letter of apology for his teachings.

== Death ==
Bebawi died on February 4, 2021, at the age of 82 and his funeral ceremony was held in St. Mary & St. Mark Coptic Orthodox Church, Indianapolis.

== Publications ==
- The letters of Ignatius of Antioch. 1972.
- St. Cyril of Alexandria: Scholia on the Incarnation. 1972.
- A Patristic Commentary on the Lord’s Prayer. 1972.
- Why Was Jesus Baptized?. 1973.
- St. Cyril of Alexandria: Commentary on the Gospel of St. John, Chapters 1-11, Volume One. 1974.
- Man, the Image of God: A study in the Bible, St. Athanasius and St. Cyril of Alexandria. 1974.
- St. Cyril of Alexandria: Commentary on the Creed. 1977.
- St. Cyril of Alexandria: Christ is One. 1977.
- St. Athanasius of Alexandria: Contra Apollianrius, I & II. 1977.
- St. Athanasius of Alexandria: The Letters to Serapion. 1978.
- A Patristic and Historical Commentary on the Lima Document of the WCC, on Baptism, the Eucharist and Ministry. 1979.
- Sin and Redemption, A Study of the ‘De Incarnatione’ of St. Athanasius. 1980.
- Baptism in the Universal Church in the First Five Hundred Years. 1980.
- Cross and Crescent: Making Connections Between Faiths. 2000.
- Psalms for Jesus: A Heart Longing for Union with Christ. 2020.
- My Holy Mentor: Spiritual Teachings of Pope Kyrillos VI. 2022 (Post Departure).
