= Coptic Orthodox Church in Europe =

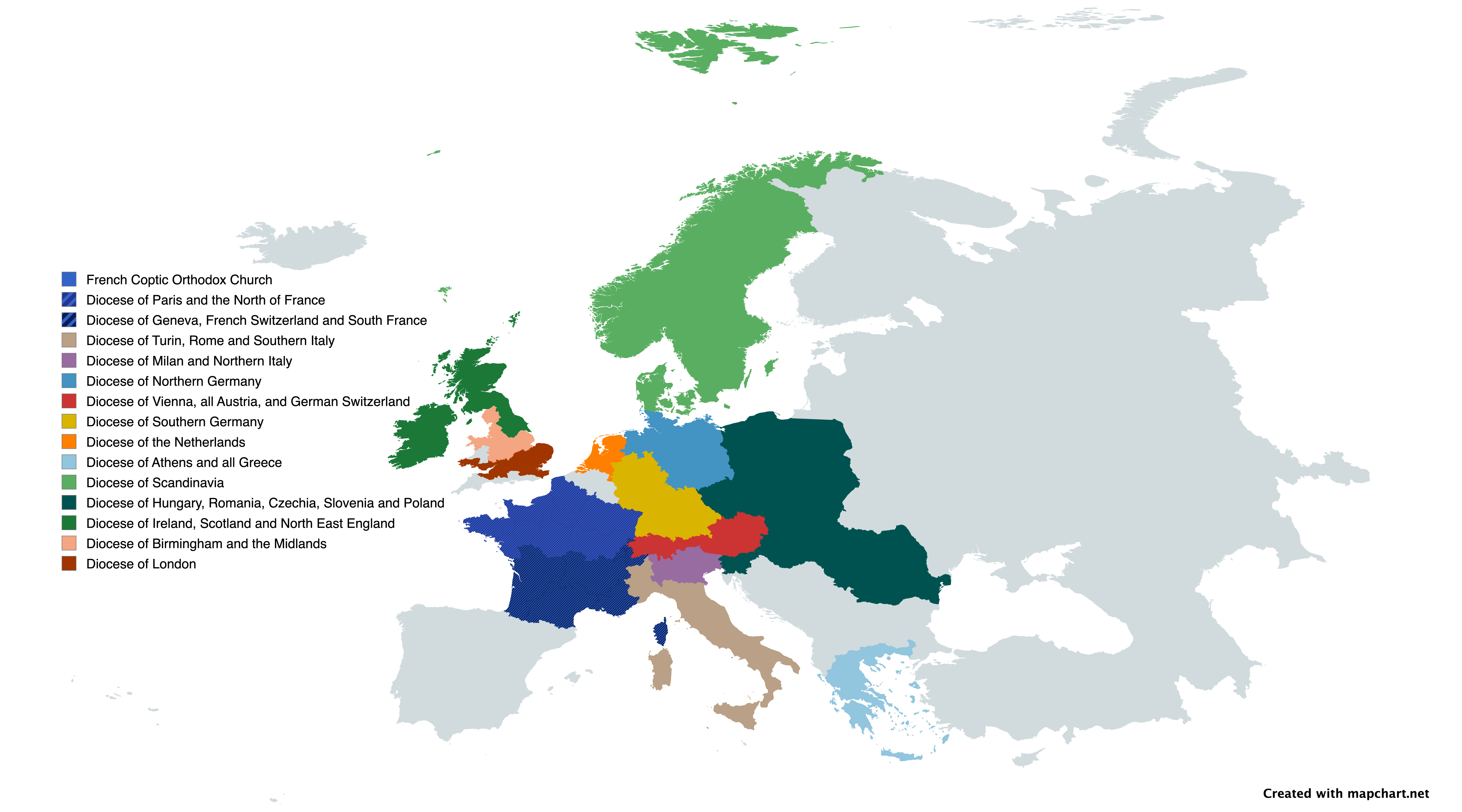
A map of the Coptic Orthodox presence in Europe

The Coptic Orthodox Church has many diocese and congregations in Europe. On 2 June 1974, Pope Shenouda III received several French Oriental Orthodox Christians into the French Coptic Orthodox Church. As of 2020, there were 15 Coptic bishops serving throughout Europe.

== Austria ==
The Coptic faithful in Austria have been led by Gabriel, bishop of Vienna and all Austria.

== France ==
On 18 June 1994, Pope Shenouda III raised the French Orthodox Eparchy to the full status of the French Coptic Orthodox Church. Previously, it was established in the 1970s, following the conditional consecration of Jan Frederik Nico Blom van Assendelft-Altland—founder of the Primitive Apostolic Orthodox Church of the Syro-Byzantine Tradition. He would then become known as Marcos (Mark).

On 19 June 1994, in the presence of 62 metropolitans and bishops of the Coptic Orthodox Church, Pope Shenouda III elevated Marcos (Mark) as the first metropolitan of the Holy Metropolis of Toulon and All France and Primate of the French Coptic Orthodox Church; he served until his death in 2008. Athanasius was elevated as the auxiliary bishop to Marcos, and succeeded him until 2023.

As of 2025, France consists of three dioceses. There were more than 45,000 French Copts in 2011.

== Germany ==
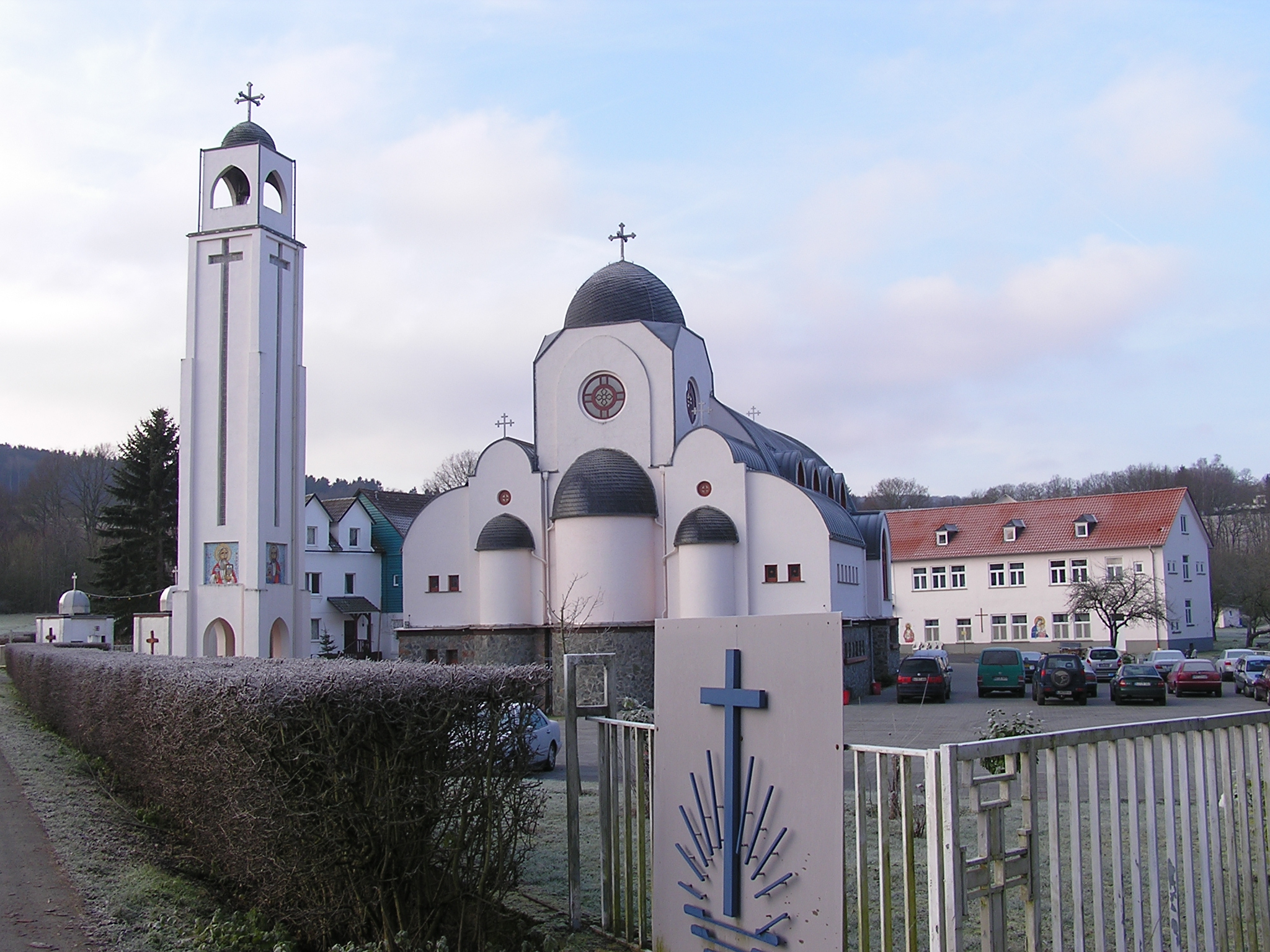
The Coptic Orthodox Monastery of St. Antonious in Waldsolms-Kröffelbach, Germany.

In Germany, the faithful have been served by Damian, bishop of Höxter-Brenkenhausen and Abbot of the Monastery of St. Mary and St. Maurice; and Michail, bishop and abbot of the Monastery of Saint Anthony the Great in Kroeffelbach, Germany. Michail died in 2023.

As of 2017, the Coptic Church in Germany consisted of some 6,000–12,000 members. The majority of its growing German membership stemmed from immigration to Europe. As of 2025, the German faithful consist of two dioceses.

== Italy ==
The Coptic Orthodox faithful in Italy have been led by Barnaba, bishop of Turin, Rome and Southern Italy; and Antonio, bishop of Milan and Northern Italy and Abbot of the Monastery of Saint Shenouda the Archimandrite in Milan. The Coptic Church in Italy is made of two dioceses. There were between 15,000 and 20,000 Copts in Italy as of 2022.

== The Netherlands ==
The Netherlands has been led by Arsany (Arsanios), bishop of Amsterdam and all the Netherlands and affiliate jurisdictions. Its Dutch diocese was established in 2013.

There is a large Coptic Orthodox community in the Netherlands, mainly in the major cities. As of 2025, they have churches in Amsterdam, Assen, Eindhoven, Enschede, The Hague, Kapelle, Leeuwarden, Utrecht and Velsen-Noord. There were an estimated 10,000 Copts in the Netherlands.

== Great Britain and Ireland ==
Great Britain and Ireland have been allegedly introduced to Oriental Orthodoxy since the purported consecration of Jules Ferrette, who was allegedly elevated as a bishop by Ignatius Peter IV to establish an Oriental Orthodox mission in the West. This mission would develop into the Ancient British Church, and later its descendants would form the Catholicate of the West. The remnants of the Catholicate of the West would later become the British Orthodox Church, which joined the Coptic Orthodox Church. As of 2015, the British Orthodox Church was no longer canonically recognized as an Oriental Orthodox church.

Since the spread of the diaspora, the Coptic Orthodox Church of Alexandria has established their own separate dioceses throughout the British Isles.

Notable leaders of Coptic Orthodoxy in the British Isles have been: Bishop Missael of the Diocese of the Midlands, England; Bishop Anthony of the Diocese of Ireland, Scotland and North East England; and Bishop Angaelos of the Holy Diocese of London. There are approximately 40,000 Copts in Great Britain alone.

== Scandinavia ==
The Scandinavian Coptic communities have been under the authority of Abakir (Apa Cyrrhus), bishop of Stockholm and of all Scandinavia.

== Greece and Cyprus ==
The Copts in Greece are served by their own diocese, while the Cypriot Copts have been under the direct authority of the Coptic pope.

== Central Europe ==
Giovanni has served as diocesan bishop of the Diocese of Central Europe (Hungary, Czech Republic, Poland, Romania & Slovakia). The diocese was formed in 2017.

== See also ==
- Coptic diaspora
