= Bishop Missael =

Coptic bishop

- Bishop of the Coptic Orthodox Diocese of the Midlands, U.K.
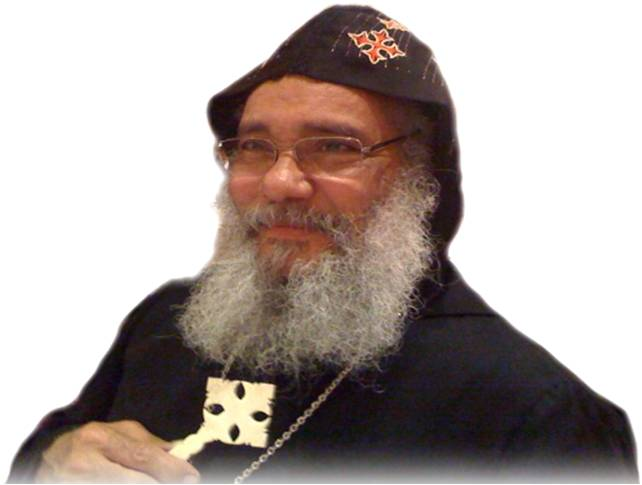
- Bishop Misael
- Installed: 26 May 1991
- Other post: member of The Holy Synod of the Coptic Orthodox Church

Orders
- Ordination: 25 May 1980
- Consecration: consecrated by Pope Shenouda III

Personal details
- Born: Bishop Missael Egypt
- Denomination: Oriental Orthodoxy
- Residence: St. Mary & St. Mark's Coptic Orthodox Centre, Birmingham, United Kingdom

Bishop Missael (born 1940) is a diocesan bishop of the Coptic Orthodox Church of Alexandria consecrated by Pope Shenouda III on 26 May 1991 to oversee the Coptic Orthodox Diocese of the Midlands, U.K. In this capacity, he is a member of The Holy Synod of the Coptic Orthodox Church.

== Early life ==
On 11 November 1962, a 22-year-old man who joined the Syrian (St. Mary's) Monastery in Wadi Natroun in Egypt was ordained as a monk, with the name "Missael" after St. Missael the Anchorite, where Pope Shenouda III (117th Pope from 1971 – 2012) and Metropolitan Pachomious (the Patriarchal locum tennis in 2012) were fellow monks.

Soon after his fellow monk Fr Antonious was ordained as Bishop Shenouda by Pope Cyril VI, Fr. Missael was ordained as a priest on 1 November 1967, and later a hegumen on 17 May 1969 by Bishop Shenouda.

It is known that Fr Missael served for a period of four years as secretary of Pope Cyril VI.

After the death of Pope Cyril VI, Bishop Shenouda was enthroned as his successor in 1971, becoming Pope Shenouda III. He appointed Fr. Missael as his first secretary.

== Ordination as Bishop and being sent to the United Kingdom ==
Pope Shenouda III called his secretary to be ordained as a General Bishop, ordaining him on 25 May 1980; Bishop Missael was sent to the United Kingdom, becoming the first bishop from the Coptic Orthodox Patriarchate to reside there. During his time as General Bishop, Bishop Missael consecrated St. Mary & St. Antony's Coptic Orthodox Church in 1985 and established St. Mary & St. Mark's Coptic Orthodox Centre in 1989 – both in Birmingham.

On 26 May 1991 Bishop Missael was ordained as the first diocesan bishop for the Diocese of Birmingham by Pope Shenouda III. This was the first diocese established by the Coptic Orthodox Patriarchate in all the lands of immigration (including Europe, America, Australia). In 2006 the Diocese of Birmingham was renamed the Diocese of the Midlands in the United Kingdom.

Bishop Missael is based at St. Mary & St. Mark's Coptic Orthodox Centre in Birmingham, and oversees the diocese, which has 15 churches and missions.

== See also ==
- Coptic Orthodox Diocese of the Midlands, U.K.
- The Holy Synod of the Coptic Orthodox Church
- Coptic Orthodox Church in Europe
- Coptic Orthodox Church in Britain and Ireland
