= Coptic Orthodox Diocese of the Midlands =

Previously titled Diocese of Birmingham

The Coptic Orthodox Diocese of the Midlands, UK is a diocese of the Coptic Orthodox Church of Alexandria, an autocephalous Oriental Orthodox church.

== History ==
=== Background and foundation ===
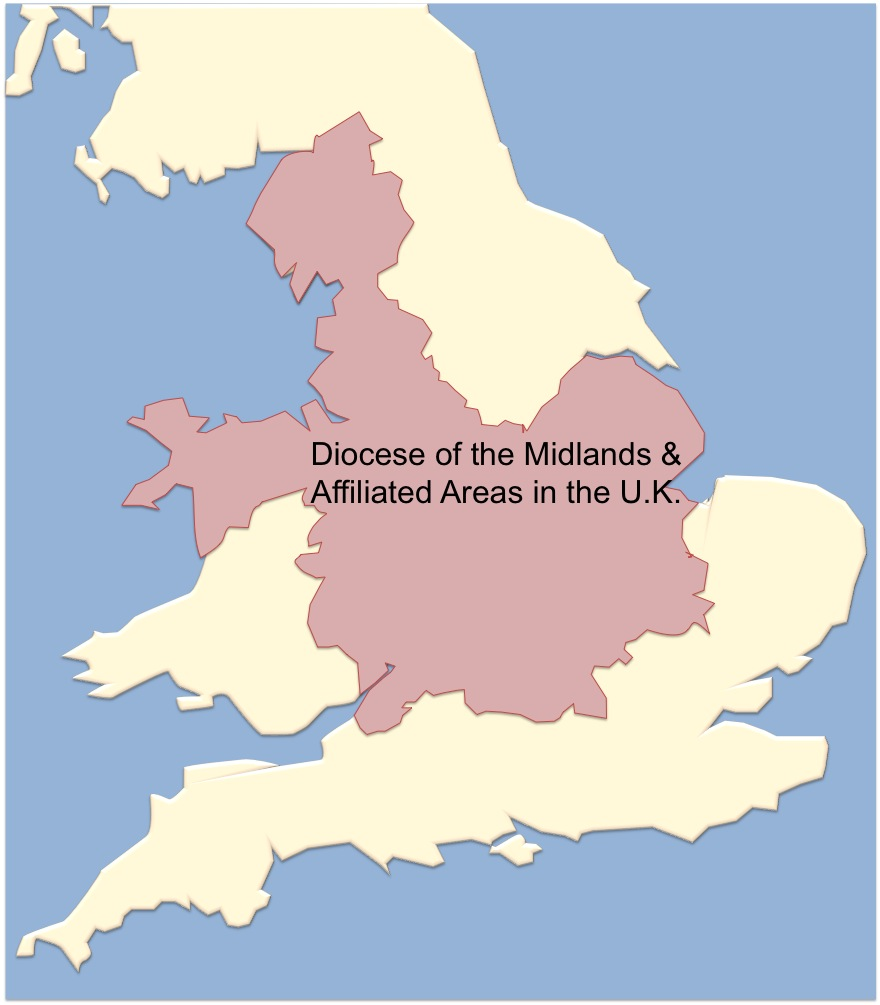
Coptic Orthodox Diocese of the Midlands, UK

In 1991 the first Coptic Orthodox Diocese to be established in the United Kingdom, and one of the first in the diaspora, was the Diocese of the Midlands, UK (although at the time known as the Diocese of Birmingham). Pope Shenouda III appointed Bishop Missael (who was at the time a general bishop) to oversee this diocese, which he has continued to do to this day.

The diocese is headquartered at St Mary & St Mark's Coptic Orthodox Centre in Lapworth, Warwickshire, where the bishop also resides.

The seal of the diocese depicts a crucifix and fish based on the ancient 4th-5th-century limestone Coptic engraving currently situated in the Louvre Museum, France.

=== Bishop Missael ===
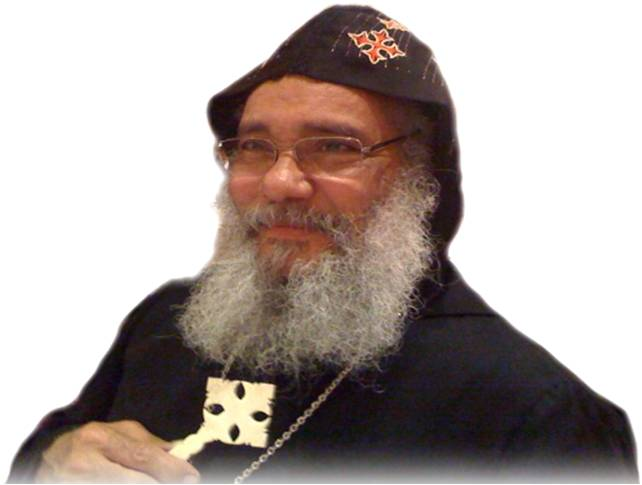
Bishop Missael

Before becoming bishop of the diocese, Bishop Missael consecrated St Mary & St Antony's Coptic Church in 1985, and established the Coptic Orthodox Centre in Lapworth in 1989. These later formed part of the early diocese.

On 26 May 1991, Bishop Missael was consecrated as bishop of the diocese of Birmingham, by Pope Shenouda III. In 2006, the diocese was renamed "the Diocese of the Midlands" (in the United Kingdom).

The diocese was the first diocese under the Coptic Orthodox Patriarchate to be established in the United Kingdom and one of the first in all the lands of immigration (Europe, America, Australia). Following its establishment by Pope Shenouda III, the Diocese of Ireland, Scotland and North East England (Bishop Antony) was formed and Bishop Angaelos was ordained a general bishop over Stevenage in 1995 and 1999 respectively. Thus, Bishop Missael became the first permanent Coptic Orthodox bishop to serve the United Kingdom.

== See also ==
- Coptic Orthodox Church of Alexandria
- Coptic Orthodox Church in Europe
- Coptic Orthodox Church in Britain and Ireland
