= Pope Shenouda III of Alexandria =

Head of the Coptic Church from 1971 to 2012

His Holiness Pope Shenouda III
- Pope of Alexandria and Patriarch of the See of St. Mark
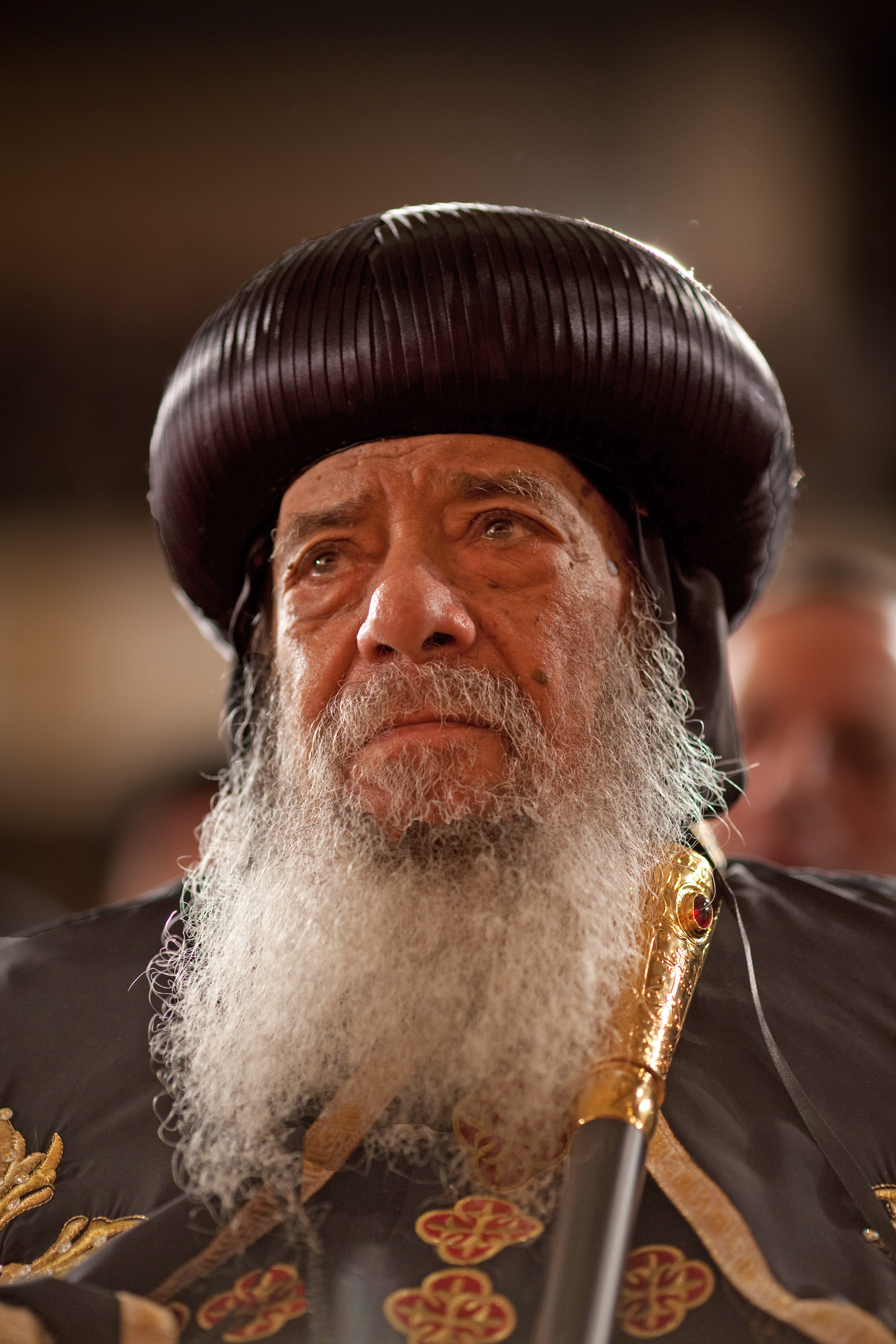
- Pope Shenouda III in 2009
- Native name: Ⲡⲁⲡⲁ Ⲁⲃⲃⲁ Ϣⲉⲛⲟⲩϯ ⲅ̅; البابا شنودة الثالث
- Church: Coptic Orthodox Church of Alexandria
- Archdiocese: Alexandria
- See: Alexandria
- Papacy began: 14 November 1971
- Papacy ended: 17 March 2012
- Predecessor: Cyril VI
- Successor: Tawadros II

Orders
- Ordination: 1954 (priesthood)
- Consecration: 30 September 1962

Personal details
- Born: Nazir Gayed Roufail نظير جيد روفائيل; 3 August 1923 Abnub, Asyut Governorate, Egypt
- Died: 17 March 2012 (aged 88) Cairo, Egypt
- Buried: Monastery of Saint Pishoy, Scetes, Egypt
- Denomination: Coptic Orthodox Christian
- Residence: Coptic Orthodox Patriarchal Residence

Pope Shenouda III (Note: English pronunciation: /ʃəˈnuːdə/; Egyptian Arabic pronunciation: [ʃeˈnuːdæ]; Coptic: Ⲡⲁⲡⲁ Ⲁⲃⲃⲁ Ϣⲉⲛⲟⲩϯ ⲅ̅, romanized: Papa Abba Šenoude pimah šoumt; Arabic: بابا الإسكندرية شنودة الثالث, romanized: Bābā al-Iskandarīyah Shinūdah al-Thālith) (born Nazir Gayed Roufail; (Note: نظير جيد روفائيل, IPA: [nɑˈzˤiːɾ ˈɡæjjed ɾʊfæˈʔiːl]) 3 August 1923 – 17 March 2012) was the 117th Pope of Alexandria and Patriarch of the See of St. Mark. His papacy lasted 40 years, 4 months, and 4 days, from 14 November 1971 until his death in 2012.

His official title was Pope of Alexandria and the Patriarch of All Africa on the Holy Apostolic Throne of Saint Mark the Evangelist, Father of fathers, Shepherd of shepherds, Successor of Saint Mark, thirteenth among the Apostles, Ecumenical Judge, Beloved of Christ. He was also the head of the Holy Synod of the Coptic Orthodox Church. He was known as a conservative figure within the church, and was respected within the Muslim community.

He became a monk in 1954 under the name Father Antonios after joining the Syrian Monastery in Wadi El-Natrun. In 1958, he was elevated to the priesthood. In 1962, Pope Cyril VI summoned Fr. Antonios and consecrated him General Bishop for Christian Education and as Dean of the Coptic Orthodox Theological Seminary, whereupon he assumed the papal name Shenouda, which was the name of the Coptic saint Shenoute the Archimandrite, as well as two previous popes: Shenouda I and Shenouda II.

Following the death of Pope Cyril VI on 9 March 1971, the selection process resulted in Bishop Shenouda becoming the new Pope. He was consecrated on 14 November 1971. During his papacy, the Coptic Orthodox Church grew significantly outside of Egypt. He appointed the first bishops for North American dioceses, which now contain more than 250 parishes, up from four in 1971. He also appointed the first Coptic bishops in Europe, Australia and South America. Within Egypt, he struggled for the welfare of his people and the church. Pope Shenouda III was known for his commitment to ecumenism and advocated inter-denominational Christian dialogue.

== Early life ==
Papal styles of Pope Shenouda III
- Reference style: His Most Blessed Beatitude and His Holiness
- Spoken style: Your Holiness
- Religious style: Pope and Patriarch
- Posthumous style: The Thrice Blessed Pope

Shenouda III was born as Nazir Gayed Roufail in the village of Salaam, which administratively belongs to the Governorate of Asyut in Upper Egypt but ecclesiastically belongs to the Diocese of Manfalut. He was the youngest of a family of eight children, five girls and three boys. Among his siblings were Raphael (Rouphael) and Shawki (Fr. Botros Gayed, 1918–1996). Roufail's mother died shortly after his birth. He was raised by his older brother, Raphael, in Damanhur in lower Egypt, where he attended a Coptic elementary school. Soon after, he studied at the American Middle School in Banha. He then moved to Shubra, a suburb of Cairo, where he enrolled at the Faith Senior Secondary.

From the age of 14, Roufail began reading poetry and he wrote many poems himself, especially between 1946 and 1962. By the age of 16, he was active in the Coptic Sunday School movement. He served as a Sunday school teacher, first at Saint Anthony's Church in Shoubra and then at Saint Mary's Church in Mahmasha.

In 1943, Roufail enrolled in Cairo University (then called the University of King Fouad I) studying towards a Bachelor of Arts degree, majoring in English and History. Meanwhile, he spent his summer vacations at the monastery of Saint Mary El-Sourian, also called the Syrian Monastery, in Wadi El-Natrun. While a university student, he was a trainee in the Egyptian Military Reserve Corps.

In 1946, while still in his final year of undergraduate studies, he was allowed to enroll in the evening classes at the Coptic Theological Seminary. The seminary was usually open only to university graduates, but the dean of the Seminary, Archdeacon Habib Girgis, made an exception in the case of Roufail. The personality of Habib Girgis was instrumental in shaping that of the future pope, and Pope Shenouda always spoke highly of Habib Girgis.

Roufail graduated from Cairo University with a BA in history in 1947. After graduation, he completed his military service, and began work as a teacher of English, history, and social sciences in a high school in Cairo. Meanwhile, he attended graduate courses in archaeology and classics at Cairo University, specializing in the History of Ancient Egypt and Islamic Egypt. He worked as a high school teacher by day, and attended classes at the Coptic Theological Seminary by night. Upon graduation from the seminary in 1949, he was appointed to teach New Testament and Old Testament Studies at the Seminary.. In the same year, he became the editor-in-chief of the Sunday School Monthly Magazine. In 1950, Roufail resigned from secular employment to take up a full-time lecturing position at the seminary.

In 1952 he was elected a member of the Egyptian Journal Syndicate. In 1953, he was appointed a lecturer at the Monastic College in Helwan, offering courses in theology there. In the same year, he began his dialogue with Jehovah's Witnesses, writing articles about their beliefs in the Sunday School Magazine.

Nazir with others laboured for several years to establish a strong Sunday school and youth group at St Anthony's Church in Shubra. His ministry produced many devoted servants, who began establishing youth groups in neighbouring parishes.

An avid reader, he was a keen student of languages. He spoke fluent Arabic (Standard, Egyptian and Sa'idi variants), English, French, and Amharic. He could read Greek (ancient and modern) and Latin as well.

== Monastic life and educational service ==
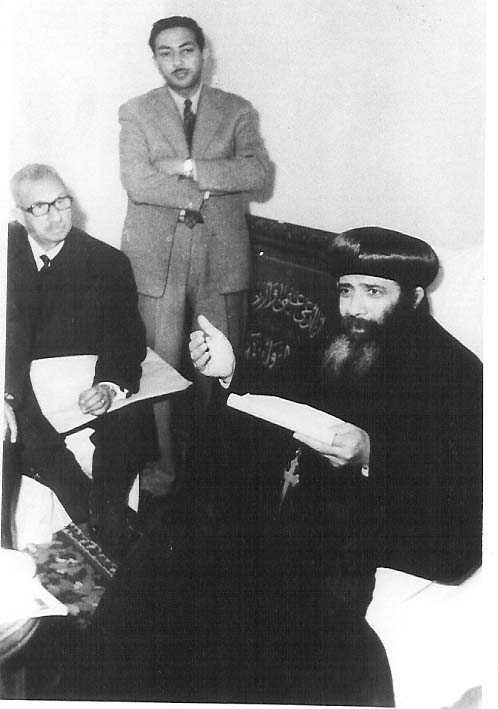
Bishop Shenouda discussing Tel Atrib excavations with Pahor Labib (seated) and Dr Ghalil Mesiha (1962)

On 18 July 1954, Roufail joined the Monastery of Saint Mary El-Souriani (commonly called the Syrian Monastery) in Wadi El-Natrun in the Nitrian Desert. He was given the name of Father Antonios el-Syriani (Anthony the Syrian). From 1956 to 1962, he lived as a hermit in a cave about seven miles from the monastery, dedicating his time to meditation, prayer, and asceticism. His austerity was known to be exceptional even by monastic standards.

On 31 August 1958, he was ordained as a priest by Bishop Theophilus, then abbot of the Syrian Monastery.

Antonios el-Syriani was among the candidates nominated for the papal throne in 1959, but Father Mina el-Baramosy became Pope Cyril VI.

== Bishop ==
On 30 September 1962, Pope Cyril VI appointed him, by force and surprise, to the bishopric of Christian Education and as Dean of the Coptic Orthodox Theological Seminary. Cyril VI also renamed him Shenouda, in honour of Saint Shenouda the Archimandrite, a famous scholar and writer of the Coptic language.

Under Bishop Shenouda's leadership, the number of students at the Coptic Orthodox Theological Seminary tripled. Bishop Shenouda was suspended in 1966 by Pope Cyril VI, essentially because of "campaigns for change" instigated by Shenouda and his students. These campaigns, among other things, called for the popular election of bishops and priests, a principle that Bishop Shenouda later applied when he became Pope of Alexandria. This conflict between Pope Cyril VI and Bishop Shenouda was later resolved.

== Pope and Patriarch ==
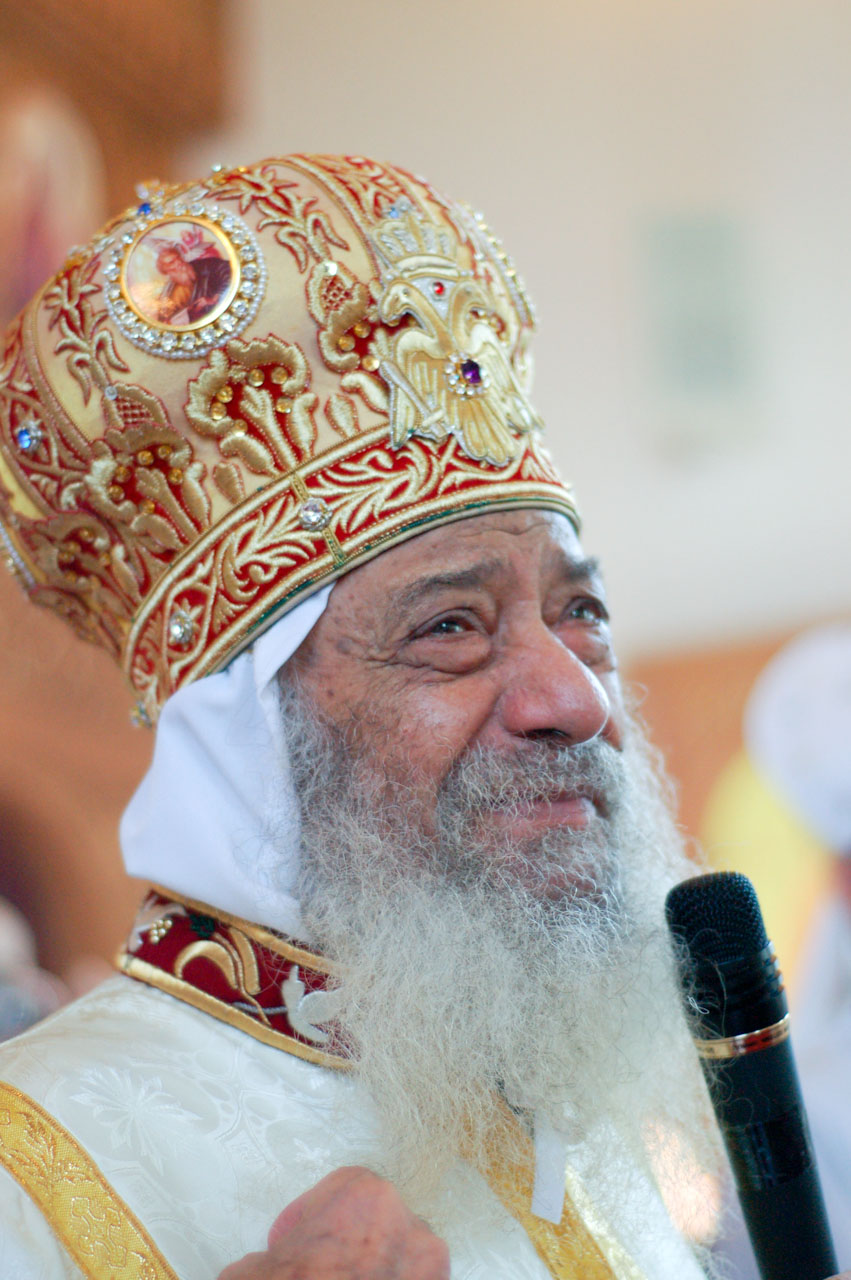
Pope Shenouda III at the consecration of a Coptic Church in Staten Island, New York City

He was enthroned as Pope Shenouda III, the 117th Pope of Alexandria and patriarch of the See of St. Mark on 14 November 1971, nearly nine months after the death of Pope Cyril VI of Alexandria. The ceremony was the first enthroning of a Coptic pope to take place in the new Saint Mark's Coptic Orthodox Cathedral in Cairo. He was the third Alexandrian Patriarch to take the name Shenouda; his namesakes were Shenouda I (859–880) and Shenouda II (1047–1077).

Less than one year after becoming Pope of the Church of Alexandria, in October 1972, Pope Shenouda visited the Ecumenical Patriarch of Constantinople and the Pope of Rome, becoming the first Alexandrian Pope to do so since the Chalcedonian Schism in 451 CE.

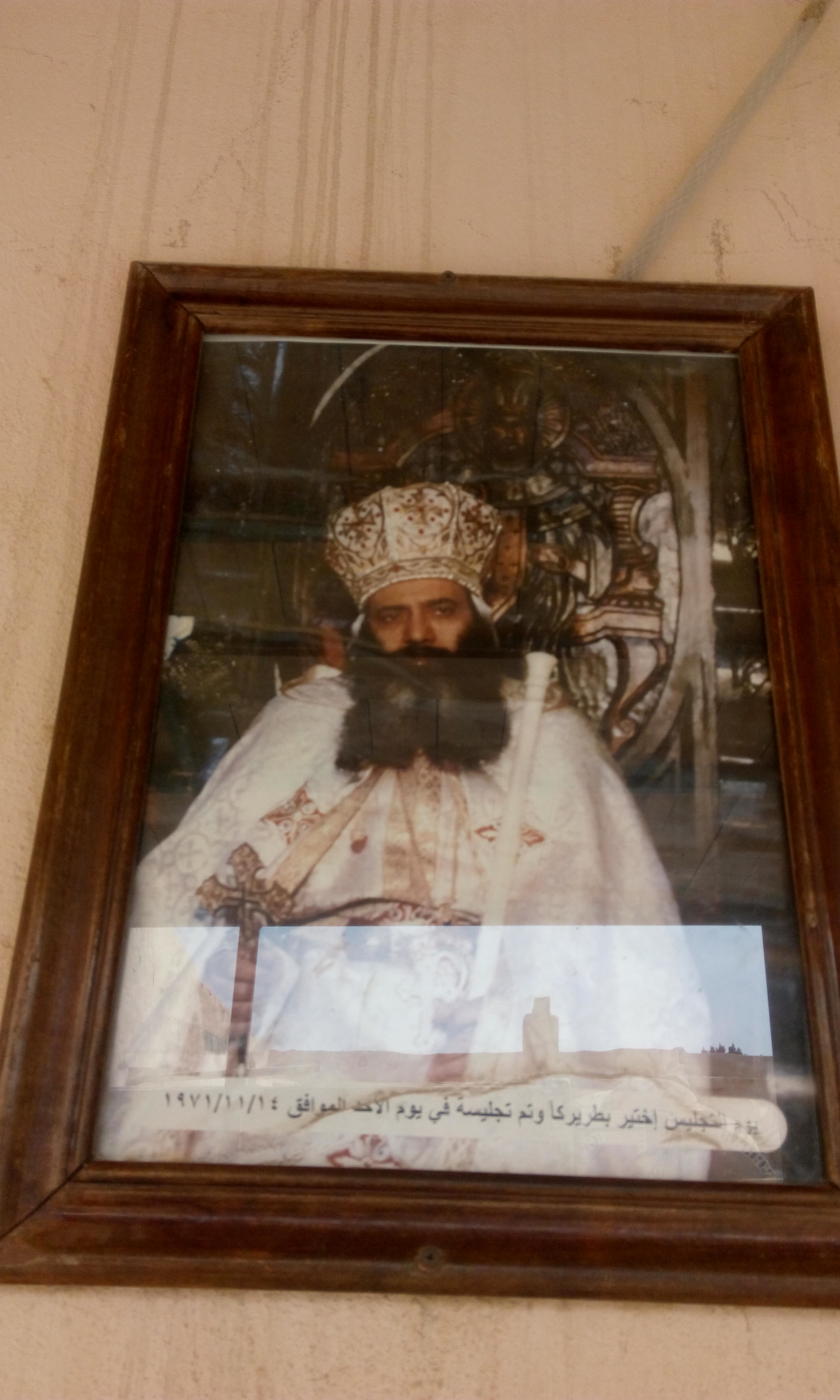
Pope Shenouda III at his enthronement as patriarch, 14 November 1971.

In May 1973, he penned a statement on the Nature of Christ that was agreed upon with the Roman Catholic Church in a step towards settling the Christological dispute and moving towards Christian unity. On 10 May 1973, he celebrated the return by the Roman Catholic Church of part of the relics of Pope Athanasius of Alexandria.

From 25 to 30 September 1974, he went on a pastoral trip to visit the Ethiopian Church during the reign of Emperor Haile Selassie of Ethiopia. Between 14 April and 23 May 1974, he became the first Coptic pope to visit North America when he visited the US and Canada. It was to become the first of many visits to that part of the world during his long Papacy. He also visited Australia six times: in 1989, 1991, 1993, 1995, 1996, and 2002. He conducted an extended Silver Jubilee tour from 18 May to 20 December 1996 which took him to Europe, Canada, USA and Australia. From 11 to 13 April 2008, he made a second historical trip to Ethiopia following the resolution of the strain in the relationship between the two churches caused by the communist coup in Ethiopia decades earlier.

== Political stances ==
=== Falling out with President Sadat ===
Ten years into his papacy, in 1981, Pope Shenouda III had famously fallen out with President Anwar Sadat of Egypt. The relationship between the two men deteriorated for several reasons.

- Since coming to power, President Sadat had started encouraging the growth of Islamism in the country as a means to fight communist groups and solidify his own power. During the term of office of Sadat's predecessor, Gamal Abdul Nasser, Islamic groups such as the Muslim Brotherhood had been suppressed.
- Sadat had also pushed forward a constitutional amendment that would have allowed him to stand for re-election as president more than twice. To make the constitutional amendment more appealing to the populace, Sadat bundled it with another constitutional amendment declaring Islamic Sharia law the main source of legislation, an action viewed as a step towards a more radically Islamic Egypt.
- Under Sadat, the Government released a census in 1977 that understated the number of Christians even contradicting earlier released censuses.
- The years from 1972 to 1981 saw an escalation of violence against the Christians of Egypt culminating in a massacre of Christians in a poor district of Cairo in 1981.
- Pope Shenouda was of the opinion that Sadat's peace treaty with Israel was ill-timed and should have been part of a larger comprehensive peace in the Middle East.

Sadat was seen by Pope Shenouda as becoming increasingly dictatorial following his acclaim in the international arena for the peace accord with Israel. In September 1981 Sadat rescinded the presidential decree of 1971 recognizing Pope Shenouda as Pope of Alexandria, and Pope Shenouda was banished by Sadat to the ancient desert monastery of St. Pishoy. However, the Christians of Egypt continued to view Pope Shenouda as their Pope and only leader, and he continued to conduct his duties from the monastery; ecclesiastically, Sadat's decision was ineffective. Sadat was assassinated a month later, on 6 October 1981, by Islamic extremists, and in January 1985 Pope Shenouda III was fully reinstated by Sadat's successor, Hosni Mubarak.

=== Israel ===
Pope Shenouda III came into conflict with then-President Anwar Sadat over both the Camp David Accords and what he said was the president's deficient response to growing Islamism. After a series of protests that led president Sadat to depose Pope Shenouda III, he was exiled by Sadat and sent to the Nitrian Desert, to return three years after Sadat's assassination following an amnesty by Sadat's successor Hosni Mubarak.

His stance toward Israel was encapsulated by his words:

From the Arabic national point we should not abandon our Palestinian brothers and our Arabic brothers by normalising our relations with the Jews ... From the church point of view, Copts who go to Jerusalem betray their church in the case of "Al-Sultan Monastery" that Israel refuses to give to the Copts.

He also stated:

"I will never go to Jerusalem except hand-in-hand with my Muslim brothers after the end of the Israeli occupation."

He also warned that Copts who visited Jerusalem would face excommunication on the premise that there was "no pilgrimage duty in Christianity and it is not a religious pillar, so since this visit can do harm to our national cause and [to the] Muslim and Christian people then we better not visit Jerusalem." He added that Copts should only go to Jerusalem after peace was established in the region. Some of the Coptic property within the compound of the Church of the Holy Sepulchre (including the Coptic monastery known as Deir El-Sultan) was delegated to the Ethiopian Orthodox Church. The Coptic Orthodox Holy Synod, based on the direction of Pope Shenouda III, also decided to ask Copts not to visit Jerusalem until the church possessions and the monastery be returned. In 2006, the Holy Synod renewed the decree, urging Copts not to visit the Christian holy places in Israel, including Jerusalem.

=== Suicide bombers ===
In the light of the September 11 attacks, he said of suicide bombing as a tactic that:

People who support and found reasons to feel good over these incidents are doing more than one wrong thing: first, ignoring the tragedy of killing an innocent group of people. Second, not thinking about the reaction of showing they found satisfaction in the incidents. Third, they are considered accomplices in the crime. Fourth, they are committing a wrongful act not approved by religion.

== Persecution of Christians in Egypt ==
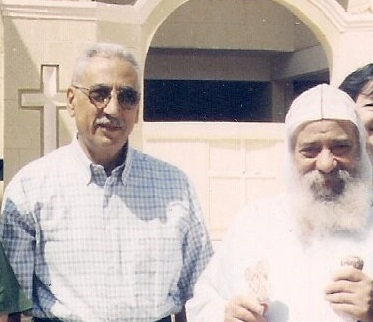
Pope Shenouda III with Judge Sami Farag (2005)

Persecution against Christians during Pope Shenouda III's reign was chiefly conducted by private individuals and organizations, especially radical Salafis, although the state continued to enforce long-standing discriminatory policies and engage in occasional Christian-baiting. Particularly in Upper Egypt, the rise in extremist Salafi groups such as the Gama'at Islamiya during the 1980s was accompanied by attacks on Copts and on Coptic churches. The police have been accused of siding with the attackers in some of these cases.

Hundreds of Coptic Christian girls have been kidnapped and forcibly converted to Islam, as well as being victims of rape and forced marriage to Muslim men.

On Sunday, 2 January 2000, 21 Coptic Christians in Kosheh village, 450 kilometres south of Cairo, were massacred by Salafists. Christian properties were also burned. Later, a criminal court in Sohag governorate released all 89 defendants charged in the Kosheh massacre without bail. Pope Shenouda III rejected the verdict openly, and told reporters, "We want to challenge this ruling. We don't accept it." As the court sentence could not be appealed, Pope Shenouda III said: "We will appeal this sentence before God."

== Church growth ==
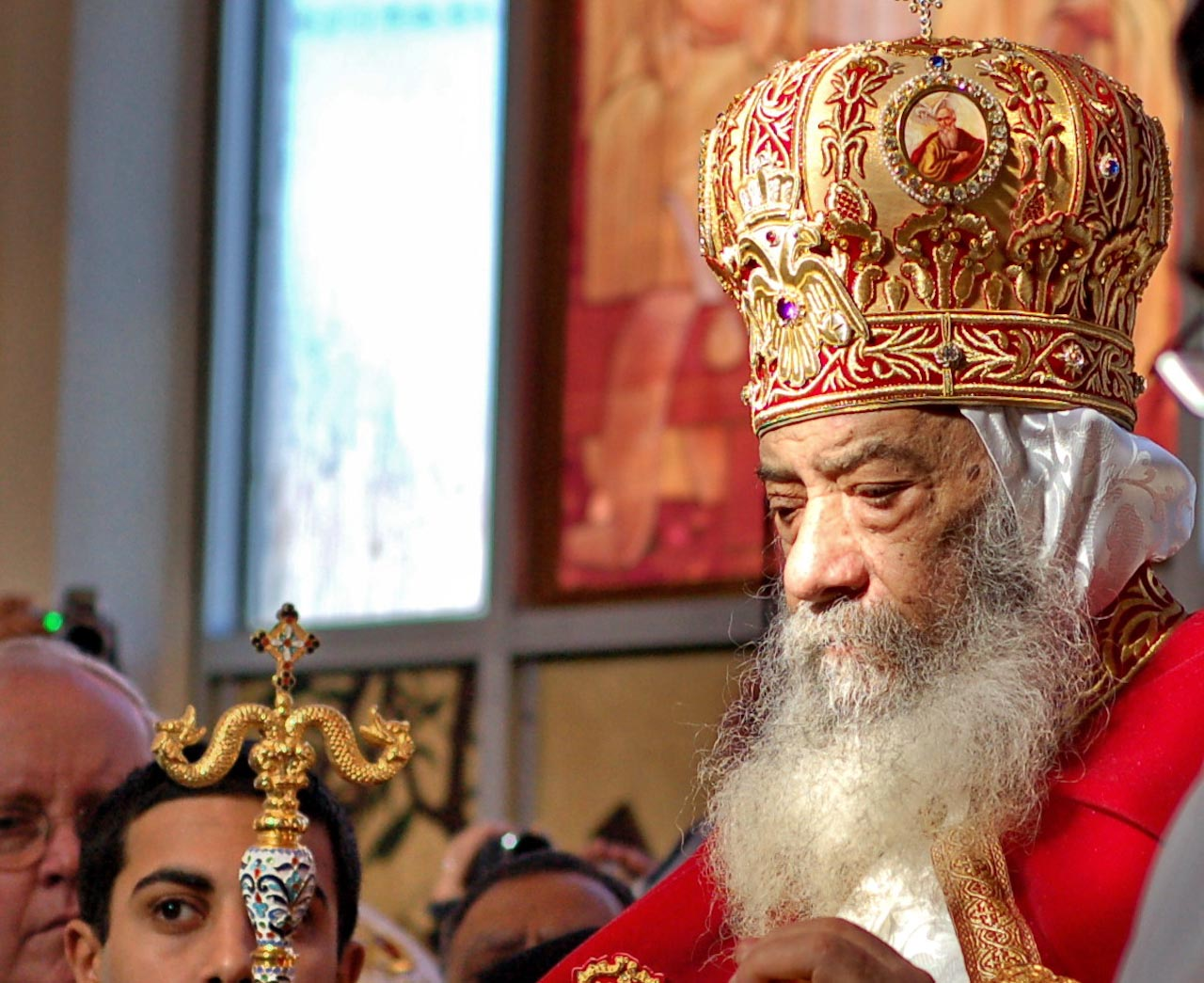
Pope Shenouda III during the consecration of a new Coptic Church in New York, US

The papacy of Pope Shenouda III saw an expansion of the Coptic Orthodox Church in North America. While there were only four Coptic Orthodox churches in all of North America in 1971, today there are more than 250 parishes (214 in the United States, 38 in Canada and one in Mexico). Pope Shenouda established the first diocese in the lands of immigration for the Coptic Orthodox Patriarchate in 1991, the Diocese of Birmingham; and appointed the general bishop for the United Kingdom at the time, Bishop Missael to oversee it by consecrating and enthroning him as its bishop.

== Relations with other churches ==
Pope Shenouda III was well known for his commitment to ecumenism. In 1973, Pope Shenouda III became the first Coptic Orthodox Pope of Alexandria to meet the Bishop of Rome in over 1,500 years. In this visit, Pope Shenouda III and Pope Paul VI signed a common declaration on the issue of Christology and agreed to further discussions on Christianity. There were also dialogues with various Protestant churches worldwide.

In an address he gave at an ecumenical forum during the International Week of Prayer in 1974, he declared, "The whole Christian world is anxious to see the church unite. Christian people, being fed up with divisions, are pushing their church leaders to do something about church unity and I am sure that the Holy Spirit is inspiring us."

=== Ethiopian Church conflict ===
Following the arrest and imprisonment of Abune Tewophilos, Patriarch of Ethiopia, by the Derg regime that had deposed Emperor Haile Selassie in 1974, Pope Shenouda III refused to recognise Abune Takla Haymanot, who was installed as Tewophilos' successor. He, along with the Holy Synod, argued that the removal of Patriarch Abune Tewophilos was illegal and contrary to canon law, as it was an act of political interference. In the eyes of the Coptic Church, Abune Tewophilos remained the legitimate patriarch of Ethiopia.

Though Patriarch Tewophilos was said to have been executed, the government of Ethiopia did not acknowledge that this had happened. Thus, the Coptic Orthodox Church of Alexandria refused to recognise any other Patriarch as long as Abune Tewophilos' death had not been confirmed. Formal ties between the Coptic Church and Ethiopia were then severed, although they remained in full communion. Formal relations between the two churches resumed on 13 July 2007.

== Theological disputes ==
Pope Shenouda III was involved in theological disagreements concerning the issue of theosis—the transforming effect of divine grace. He published eight booklets explaining his view of theosis and lectured on the issue in the theological seminary of Cairo and also in the seminary of Alexandria. Following the death of Father Matta El Meskeen, who held an opposing view, Pope Shenouda III issued warnings against those views. In addition to his dispute with Fr. Matta El Meskeen, Shenouda got into theological disputes with Hany Mina Mikhail, George Habib Bebawi—whom he infamously excommunicated—and Henein Abd El Messih.

== Illness and death ==
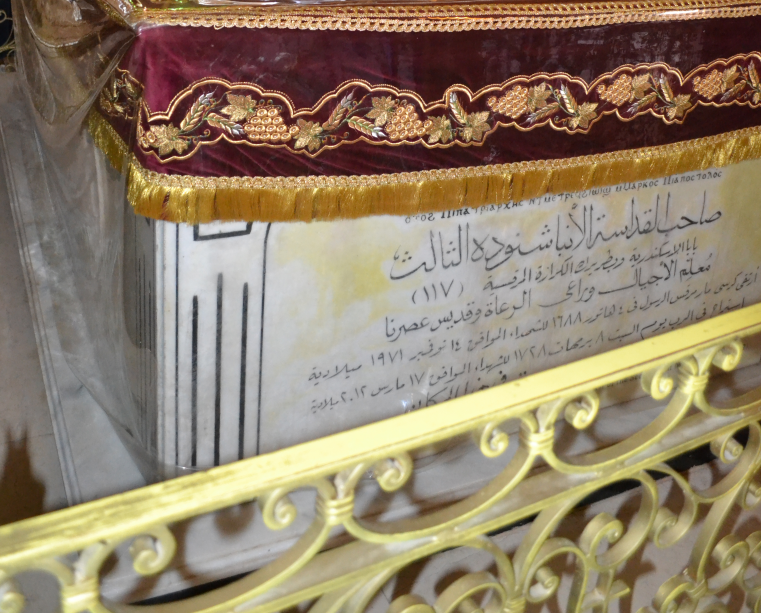
Tomb of Shenouda III at Monastery of Saint Pishoy

In the months prior to Pope Shenouda's death, rumours, which were denied by the Holy Synod, had spread through Cairo's Coptic community that he had fallen into a coma. He regularly flew to the United States for medical treatment and, according to his doctor he "[suffered] from kidney disease and diabetes."

Pope Shenouda III died on 17 March 2012 (8 Paremhat 1728 in the Coptic calendar) of lung and liver complications at his official residence shortly after returning from medical treatment abroad. He had stopped taking medication because he was too weak. However, Sherine Tadros, a Coptic reporter for Al Jazeera English, reported that he had been in good spirits prior to his death. The funeral took place after three days of lying in state; on 20 March, he was buried at the Monastery of Saint Pishoy in Wadi el-Natrun, in accordance with his wishes. Metropolitan Pachomious of Beheira and Pentapolis was appointed to take over papal duties until the election of a new Pope, being the second-most-senior Metropolitan in the Holy Synod in age after Anba Mikhail. Due to his failing health and age, Mikhail delegated this duty to Metropolitan Pachomios during the first meeting of the Holy Synod after Shenouda's death.

=== Domestic reactions ===
During the night, an estimated one million or more mourners were said to have visited his body at St. Mark's Cathedral, causing traffic jams stretching for kilometres. The body was taken out of the coffin and lay in a seated position on a ceremonial throne dressed in gold- and red-embroidered vestments, a golden mitre upon his head with a gold-tipped staff in his hand. Many Coptic figures from across the world started to return to the country to pay their respects and work towards the selection of a new pope. Mourners from across Egypt went to Saint Mark Cathedral in Abbaseya to pay their respects. Bells tolled in Cairo's Abbasiya district, where the primary cathedral of the Coptic Church is located. So large was the crowd of mourners gathering in Cathedral Square to pay their respects that three were killed and 137 injured in a crush as the queue to view the body of the deceased pope stretched for more than one kilometre. Viewing was cut short after the tragedy, and the cathedral was closed to the public.

The funeral of Pope Shenouda III was attended by religious figures in the Arab world. Shown in this image are, from the left, Moez Masoud and Habib Ali al-Jifri.

Political and religious reactions to his death came from across the Egyptian spectrum and internationally. The Supreme Council of the Armed Forces issued a statement on Facebook that expressed their wish of "preserving the unity of Egypt and the unity of its social fabric". It added that with the loss, the country should "consolidate with each other in order to pass with Egypt towards security and stability." Its leader, Field Marshal Mohamed Hussein Tantawi, decreed three days of mourning for Christians working for state institutions. The Muslim Brotherhood's Freedom and Justice Party's Speaker of Parliament Saad Katatni said of Shenouda's death that Egypt had lost "one of its national icons, a man who left a void in the political arena at a critical time." The party also issued a statement signed by the party's chairman Mohamed Morsi that stated Shenouda's life was "a long journey of big contribution in various fields domestically and abroad." Prime Minister Kamal el-Ganzouri's statement read: "I give my sincere condolences to the Coptic brothers home and abroad. [He was a] national character and a symbol for patriotism and he gained wide respect and appreciation from the Egyptian people." Former Prime Minister Essam Sharaf called Shenouda a "devout clergyman, a good citizen and a valuable leader. ... His vision was always that Egypt is not the country that we live in; but the country that lives in us." Upcoming presidential candidates also issued statements. Ahmed Shafiq said that his death was a loss to Egypt because he was a "unique religious leader and a distinguished character in the national history. Coptic church will pass this hard moment because of the great legacy of Pope Shenouda;" Amr Moussa said that Pope Shenouda III was "a great man who was working for the interests of the country. He was working for Egypt to stand as a unified front against the challenges facing the nation;" and Abdel Moneim Aboul Fotouh's campaign issued a statement saying that Fotouh had spoken with the church's bishop for youth, Bishop Moussa, to express his condolences to both the Coptic Church and Copts.

Al-Nour Party's Members of Parliament walked out when a minute's silence was held for Shenouda, with a party spokesman saying that "a minute of silence does not exist in Islam."

Sheikh Ahmed el-Tayeb, the grand imam of al-Azhar University, said that "Egypt has lost one of its rare men at a sensitive moment when it most needs the wisest of its wise – their expertise and their purity of minds;" he also added that he "greatly remembers his vision towards Jerusalem and its history." Social media was said to be abuzz with memorials as well as criticism of Shenouda.

=== International reactions ===
- Holy See – In a message of condolence to Copts, the Roman Catholic Pope Benedict XVI said: "I recall with gratitude his commitment to Christian Unity, his memorable visit to my predecessor Pope Paul VI, and their signing of the Joint Declaration of Faith in the Incarnation of the Son of God together in Rome, on 10 May 1973, as well as his Cairo meeting with Pope John Paul II during the Great Jubilee of the Incarnation, on 24 February 2000. I can say how the Catholic Church as a whole shares the grief that afflicts the Orthodox Copts, and how she stands in fervent prayer asking that He, who is the Resurrection and the Life, might welcome his faithful servant." He offered prayers for the thrice blessed Pope Shenouda on the day of his death and was said to share the pain of Copts over Pope Shenouda's repose.

Director of the Holy See Press Office Federico Lombardi said that Benedict XVI desired that "the Lord welcomes this great pastor" and added that "we will never forget the meeting between Pope Shenouda III and Pope John Paul II in Cairo on the occasion of his pilgrimage to Mount Sinai [in 2000]..." A statement attributed to him read: "The Catholic Church shares in the grief and prayers of Coptic Christians in mourning the loss of their spiritual leader...May the Lord welcome this great shepherd and give him the reward he deserves for his service."

- Iran – Deputy Foreign Minister Hossein Amir-Abdollahian praised Shenouda for "constructive and lasting efforts to achieve peace and justice" and offered his condolences to the Coptic Orthodox Church and Copts.
- United States of America – President Barack Obama said of Shenouda that "we will remember Pope Shenouda III as a man of deep faith, a leader of a great faith, and an advocate for unity and reconciliation...a beloved leader of Egypt's Coptic Christians and an advocate for tolerance and religious dialogue." He also added that "Michelle and I are saddened to learn of the passing of Coptic Christian Pope Shenouda III, a beloved leader of Egypt's Coptic Christians and an advocate for tolerance and religious dialogue. We stand alongside Coptic Christians and Egyptians as they honour his contributions in support of peace and cooperation. [His] commitment to Egypt's national unity is also a testament to what can be accomplished when people of all religions and creeds work together."

Secretary of State Hillary Clinton expressed her condolences on behalf of the United States to the Egyptian people and said: "As we reflect on his life and legacy, we reaffirm our support to the future peace and prosperity of Egypt. Our thoughts and prayers are with the Egyptian people and all those who mourn Pope Shenouda III."

- Armenia – Foreign Minister Eduard Nalbandyan visited the Egyptian Embassy in Armenia on Thursday in order to extend condolences on the death of Pope Shenouda III. Leaders of the Armenian Apostolic Church, Karekin II of Etchmiadzin and Aram I of Cilicia, offered condolences on the passing of Pope Shenouda III. Both Armenian church leaders sent a delegation to Pope Shenouda's funeral. Both Karekin II and Aram I praised Shenouda for his leadership of the Coptic Church and his unequivocal ability to work with all denominations to promote Christian unity.
- United Kingdom – The Foreign, Commonwealth and Development Office published a text citing William Hague saying, that Pope Shenouda III will be remembered "as a man of great wisdom, an advocate of dialogue and tolerance, and a symbol of national unity and reconciliation."

== Bibliography ==
- 1. Adam and Eve, Cain and Abel
- 2. Being with God*
- 3. Biblical Competition
- 4. Calmness*
- 5. Characteristics of the Spiritual Path*
- 6. Concepts
- 7. Comparative Theology*
- 8. Competition for Church History and Stories of Saints
- 9. A Complete Spiritual Curriculum (Romans 12)
- 10. Contemplations on Christmas
- 11. Contemplations on the Prayer Before Sleeping
- 12. Contemplations on the Prayer of Thanksgiving and Psalm 50
- 13. Contemplations on the Resurrection
- 14. Contemplations on the Sunset Prayer
- 15. Contemplations on the Ten Commandments: Volume I
- 16. Contemplations on the Ten Commandments: Volume II
- 17. Contemplations on the Ten Commandments: Volume III
- 18. Contemplations on the Ten Commandments: Volume IV
- 19. The Creed
- 20. Diabolic Warfare*
- 21. Discipleship*
- 22. The Divinity of Christ*
- 23. Experiences in Life: Volume I*
- 24. Experiences in Life: Volume II*
- 25. Father Michael Ibrahim
- 26. The Fear of God
- 27. Fruits of the Spirit
- 28. Grace
- 29. Good Friday
- 30. The Happy Spiritual Family
- 31. The Heresy of Salvation in a Moment
- 32. The Holy Spirit and His Work in Us
- 33. Holy Thursday
- 34. Holy Week
- 35. The Holy Zeal*
- 36. How Long, Lord? (Psalm 12)
- 37. How to Deal with Children*
- 38. How to Start a New Year
- 39. Jacob and Joseph
- 40. Jonah the Prophet*
- 41. Judging Others*
- 42. The Life of Abraham
- 43. The Life of Faith*
- 44. The Life of Hope*
- 45. The Life of David
- 46. The Life of Jacob
- 47. The Life of Humility and Meekness
- 48. The Life of Repentance and Purity*
- 49. The Life of Thanksgiving*
- 50. The Life of Virtues and Righteousness
- 51. Lord, Do Not Rebuke Me in Your Anger (Psalm 6)
- 52. Lord, How? (Psalm 3)
- 53. The Lord's Prayer
- 54. Love: Summit of Virtues
- 55. Many Years With the Questions of People: Part I*
- 56. Many Years With the Questions of People: Part II*
- 57. Many Years With the Questions of People: Part III*
- 58. Many Years With the Questions of People: Part IV*
- 59. Many Years With the Questions of People: Part V*
- 60. Many Years With the Questions of People: Part VI*
- 61. Many Years With the Questions of People: Part VII*
- 62. Many Years With the Questions of People: Part VIII*
- 63. Many Years With the Questions of People: Part IX*
- 64. Many Years With the Questions of People: Part X*
- 65. Many Years With the Questions of People: Part XI*
- 66. Many Years With the Questions of People: Part XII*
- 67. Monogamy
- 68. Moses and Pharaoh
- 69. The Nature of Christ*
- 70. O God, You Are My God, Early I Will Seek You (Psalm 63)
- 71. Pastoral Care
- 72. Praise the Lord (Psalm 150)
- 73. The Priesthood*
- 74. Psalm 20: May the Lord Answer You
- 75. Purgatory
- 76. Quizzes
- 77. Romans 12
- 78. Return to God*
- 79. The Release of the Spirit*
- 80. The Righteous Job and the Temptations
- 81. Saint Anthony*
- 82. Saint Mark
- 83. Salvation in the Orthodox Concept*
- 84. The Sermon on the Mountain*
- 85. The Seven Words of our Lord on the Cross*
- 86. The Spirituality of Fasting*
- 87. Spirituality of Prayer with the Agbia
- 88. Spiritual Lukewarmness
- 89. The Spiritual Means*
- 90. The Spiritual Person*
- 91. The Spiritual Service and the Spiritual Servant – Volume 1
- 92. The Spiritual Service and the Spiritual Servant – Volume 2
- 93. The Spiritual Service and the Spiritual Servant – Volume 3
- 94. Spiritual Vigilance
- 95. Spiritual Warfare*
- 96. Tears
- 97. Temptation on the Mountain
- 98. Ten Concepts
- 99. Thine is the Power and the Glory*
- 100. Verses to Learn
- 101. Why the Resurrection?
- 102. Words of Spiritual Benefit: Volume I*
- 103. Words of Spiritual Benefit: Volume II*
- 104. Words of Spiritual Benefit: Volume III*
- 105. Words of Spiritual Benefit: Volume IV*
- 106. Wrath

- * Translated into English

== Awards ==
In 2000, Pope Shenouda III was awarded the UNESCO-Madanjeet Singh Prize for the Promotion of Tolerance and Non-Violence by UNESCO Director-General Koichiro Matsuura on the recommendation of an international jury. The award was "for promoting exchange and understanding between Christianity and Islam in today's Middle East and his deep concern to pursue dialogue with all the great religious faiths and his major role in forging ecumenical links with all other members of the Christian family throughout the planet." In 2003 he received the Al-Gaddafi International Prize for Human Rights.

=== Honorary degrees ===
- University of Bonn
- North Park University
- University of Toledo
- University of Michigan
- Eötvös Loránd University
- Saint Peter's University
- Saint Vincent College
- Bloomfield College
- Nashotah House

=== Honours ===
Ribbon bar	Country	Honour
	Egypt	Grand Collar of the Order of the Nile
	Egypt	Grand Cordon of the Order of the Arab Republic of Egypt
	Egypt	Grand Cross of the Order of Merit
	Ethiopia	Grand Cross of the Order of the Star of Ethiopia
	Ethiopia	Grand Cordon of the Order of Solomon
	Sudan	Grand Cordon of the National Order of El-Nilein
	Syriac Catholic Church	Grand Cross of the Order of Saint Ignatius of Antioch

== See also ==
- List of Copts
- List of Egyptians
