= List of ancient Egyptian towns and cities =

Map of ancient Egypt with town names in hieroglyphs

Index of four charts of ancient Egyptian Cities

Lower Egypt

Upper Egypt part 1

Upper Egypt and part of Nubia

Nubia

This is a list of known ancient Egyptian towns and cities. The list is for sites intended for permanent settlement and does not include fortresses and other locations of intermittent habitation.

a capital of ancient Egypt
a capital of ancient Egypt and regional administrative center
Thonis italicized name: only the Greek name is known

== Lower Egypt ==
Town (popular name)	In hieroglyphs	Date founded	Nome	Patron deity	Modern name	Other name/s	Note
Men-nefer (Memphis)	mn n nfr f r O24 niwt	earlier than 3150 BC	1st	Ptah (cult center)	Mit Rahina	Ineb-Hedj, Died-Sut, Ankh-Tawy, Menfe, Hut-ka-Ptah, Moph, Noph	Capital of Egypt during the Old Kingdom; capital of its nome
Khem (Letopolis)	Aa1 O34 G17 O49	probably during Old Kingdom	2nd	Khenty-irty	Ausim		Capital of its nome
Yamu (Apis)	M1 M1 M1 niwt	probably during Old Kingdom	3rd	Hathor	Kom el-Hisn	Imu, Apis	Capital of its nome
Raqote (Alexandria)	r Z1 a A35 t niwt	331 BC	3rd	Serapis	Alexandria	Rhacotis, Rakotə, Eskendereyyah	Alexandria was the intellectual and cultural center of the ancient world for some time; capital of the Ptolemaic Kingdom
Khito (Rosetta)			3rd		Rashid	Bolbitine, Bolbitinum, Bolbitinon, Trashit, Rakhit, Rexi	Where Rosetta Stone was found
Ptkheka (Ptkheka)			4th	Neith	Tanta		Capital of its nome
Zau (Sais)	z G39 G1 G43 O49	earlier than 3300 BC	5th	Neith (cult center)	Sa el-Hagar		Capital of 24th and 26th Dynasties; capital of its nome
Per-Wadjet (Buto)	A18 X1 O49	earlier than 3250 BC	5th	Wadjet (cult center)	Tell al-Fara'in	Pe and Dep, Butus, Butosus	Where Predynastic Buto-culture was found
Khasut (Xois)	xA s w w t niwt		6th	Amun	Sakha	Xeos, Skhoo	Capital of its nome
Timinhor (Damanhur)	D46 W19 M17 M17 O49 W24 G5 Z1	later than 1200 BC	7th		Damanhur	Hermopolis Mikra, Tel Ballamon	Capital of its nome
Piemro (Naucratis)	niwt kA r T niwt	7th century BC	7th	Thoth	Kom Gieif	Ναύκρατις	First permanent Greek colony; major center for Greek Egyptian sea trade
Thonis (Heracleion)	iab t / D48A	12th century BC	7th	Amun		Ἡράκλειον	Egypt's main port during Late Period; sister city of Naucratis
Menouthis (Menouthis)			7th	Isis and Serapis			Sunk to the sea in 8th century AD; near Heracleion and Canopus
Pikuat (Canopus)	Q3 W11 Aa18 U33 X1 O49	Earlier than 600 BC	7th	Osiris	Aboukir	Canobus, Kanobos, Kanopos, Schedia	Principal port in Egypt for Greek trade before the foundation of Alexandria
Per-Atum (Pithom)	O1 Z1 X1 U15 G17 X1 O49	Around 1900 BC	8th	Atum	Tell-el-Maskhuta	Tjeku, Heroöpolis, Heroonopolis	Capital of its nome
Djedu (Busiris)	R11 R11 G43 O49	A small village until 3200 BC	9th	Osiris	Abu Sir Bana	Per Usiri	Capital of its nome
Hut-hery-ib (Athribis)	Hwt t pr tA Hr ib t niwt		10th	Repyt	Banha	Tell Atrib, Attrib, Medeenet Ashaysh	Capital of its nome
Taremu (Leontopolis)			11th	Bast and Sekhmet (cult center)	Kafr Al Muqdam	Leonto, Leontos, Tell el-Muqdam	One of the capitals during the 23rd Dynasty; capital of its nome during Ptolemaic Period
Šetennu (Pharbaetus)		earlier than 7th century BC	11th	Hormerty	Horbeit	Shednu, Sheten, Pharbaethus	Capital of its nome; one of the centers of the chiefs of the Meshwesh Libyans
Tjebnutjer (Sebennytos)	nTr T b niwt		12th	Onuris	Samanud		Hometown of Manetho; capital of the 30th Dynasty; capital of its nome
Pachnamu´nis (Pachnamunis)			12th				Principal town
Iunu (Heliopolis)	iwn nw O49	earlier than 3250 BC	13th	Ra (cult center)	Ayn Shams	Ôn, Āwen, Ὂν	Capital of its nome
Tjaru (Sile)	G47 Z1 E23 Z1 O49		14th	Horus	Tel el-Habua	Zaru, Tharu, Djaru, Tjel, Sile, Edfu of Lower Egypt	Largest ancient Egyptian fortress town; place of exile for criminals; capital of its nome
Per-Amun (Pelusium)	pr i mn n C12 niwt	Before 720 BC	14th	Amun	Tell el-Farama	Sena, Seyân, Sin, Pelousion, Paramoun, Peremoun, Peromi	Easternmost major Egyptian city; Battles of Pelusium
Weprehwy (Hermopolis Parva)		Before 2575 BC	15th		Tell al-Naqus		Capital of its nome
Tamiat (Damietta)			15th		Damietta	Damiata, Domyat, Ταμίαθις, Tamiathis	
Djedet (Mendes)	Dd d t niwt	earlier than 3250 BC	16th	Banebdjedet	Tell El-Ruba	Per-Banebdjedet, Anpet	Capital of the 29th Dynasty; capital of its nome
Semabehdet (Diospolis Inferior)	F36 bH d t niwt		17th		Tel El Balamun		Capital of its nome
Per-Bast (Bubastis)	bA st t niwt	Earlier than 3150 BC	18th	Bastet (cult center)	Tell-Basta	Per-Bastet	An ivory tag found in Tomb U-J dating 3150 BC many think has the Per-Bastet signature; One of the capitals during the 22nd and 23rd Dynasties; capital of its nome
Djanet (Tanis)	D a n t niwt	late New Kingdom	19th	Amun	Tell Nebesha	Thebes of the North, Ṣān al-Ḥagar, Zoan	Capital of 21st and 22nd Dynasties; capital of its nome; important port for Asiatic trade; center of linen manufacture.
Hut-waret (Avaris)	O7 t pr D56 t niwt	during Middle Kingdom	19th	Set	Tell el-Dab'a	Auaris, Hawara, Athyria	Capital of 14th and 15th Dynasties
Per-Ramessu (Pi-Ramesses)	pr Z1 ra ms s s	1274 BC	19th	Ramesses II	Qantir	Per-Rameses, Per Ramessu	Founded by Ramesses II; absorbed Avaris; capital of Egypt during Ramesses II's reign
Per-Sopdu (Per-Sopdu)	pr Z1 M44 G13 niwt		20th	Amun	Saft el-Hinna	Soped, Pi-Sopt	Capital of its nome

== Upper Egypt ==
Town (popular name)	In hieroglyphs	Date founded	Nome	Patron deity	Modern name	Other name/s	Note
Abu (Elephantine)	E26 O49	earlier than 3000 BC	1st	Khnum (cult center)	Aswan	Yebu	Capital of its nome
Swenett (Aswan)	s E34 n t niwt		1st	Swenett	Aswan	Syene	Location of stone quarries for Syenite granite
Nubt (Kom Ombo)	S12 X1 O49	earlier than 3000 BC	1st	Sobek (cult center)	Kom Ombo	Omboi, Ombos, Ambo, Ombi	Garrison throughout pharaonic history; arch-enemy of the city of Dendera
Behdet (Edfu)	F18 D46 X1 O49	earlier than 3000 BC	2nd	Horus (cult center)	Naga el-Goneima	Apollonopolis Magna, Apollinopolis Magna, Djeba, Utes-Hor	Capital of its nome
Nekheb (El Kab)	sw b nw niwt	earlier than 3500 BC	3rd	Nekhbet (cult center)	El Kab	Eileithyiaspolis, Lucinae Civitas	Capital of its nome before Nekhen; surrounded by a massive mud brick wall
Nekhen (Hierakonpolis)	O47 n niwt	earlier than 3210 BC	3rd	Horus (cult center)	El Kab	Al-Kom Al-Aħmar	Capital of its nome after Nekheb; opposite Nekheb on the other side of the Nile
Ta-senet (Latopolis)	HD st N35 X1 R24 I12 O49	earlier than Middle Kingdom	3rd	Khnum	Esna	Iunyt, Polis Latton, Lato	Capital of its nome after Nekhen
Waset (Thebes)	R19 t niwt	earlier than 5000 BC	4th	Amun (cult center)	Luxor	Niwt-rst, Niwt-Imn, Nōʼ ʼĀmôn, No, Iunu-shema, Diospolis Magna, Ta-pe, Hundred-gated Thebes	Capital of Egypt during most of Middle Kingdom and New Kingdom; capital of its nome; foremost religious center
Per-Hathor (Aphroditopolis)	O1 Z1 O10 O49	earlier than 3000 BC	4th	Hathor	Gebelein	Inerty, Pathyris, Naga el-Gherira	
Iuny (Hermonthis)	O28 N35 M17 O49		4th	Montu (cult center)	Armant	Erment, Iunu-Montu	Capital of its nome during Cleopatra VII
Sumenu (Crocodilopolis)	G38 G38 G38 niwt	earlier than Middle Kingdom	4th	Sobek (cult center)	el-Mahamid Qibly	Imiotru	Different from Shedet (also called Crocodilopolis)
Djerty (El-Tod)		during Old Kingdom	4th	Montu	El-Tod	Ḏrty, Touphion, Tuphium, Thouôt, Tuot	
Madu (Medamud)			4th	Montu	Medamud		
Nubt (Naqada)	S12 X1 O49	earlier than 3500 BC	5th	Set (cult center)	Naqada	Ombos, South Town	Where the Pre-dynastic Naqada culture was found
Iushenshen (Iushenshen)	N18 Z1 V7 N35 V7 N35 O49	earlier than 3000 BC	5th		Khozam		Capital of its nome during Old Kingdom
Gesy (Qus)	W11 S29 Aa17 G1 O49		5th	Horus	Qus	Gesa, Apollonopolis Parva, Apollinopolis Mikra, Apollonos minoris	A point of departure for expeditions to the Red Sea
Gebtu (Koptos)	V33 D58 G4 O49	Earlier than 3200 BC	5th	Min (cult center)	Qift	Kebto, Keft, Justinianopolis	Capital of its nome; commercial center for the Upper Egyptian Red Sea trade through Wadi Hammamat
Iunet (Dendera)	O1 Z1 G25 Aa1 X1 E1 X1 O49		6th	Hathor (cult center)	Dendera	Tentyra, Tentyris, Nikentori, Nitentori	Capital of its nome
Seshesh (Hu)	Hwt t pr z S m sxm Z2 pr niwt	earlier than 3100 BC	7th	Bat, then Hathor	Hu	Diospolis Parva, Diospolis Superior, Hut-Sekhem, Hiw	Capital of its nome
Abdju (Abydos)	Ab b Dw O49	earlier than 3000 BC	8th	Khentiamentiu, then Osiris (cult center) and Isis	al-Birba	Osiris	Capital of its nome
Tjenu (Thinis)	V13 N35 T14 M17 O49	earlier than 4000 BC	8th	Anhur		This	Capital of the 1st and 2nd Dynasties; still unlocated
Ipu (Akhmim)	M17 Q3 G43 O49	earlier than 3100 BC	9th	Min (cult center)	Akhmim	Apu, Khent-min, Khmin, Shmin, Khemmis, Chemmis, Panopolis	Capital of its nome
Hut-Repyt (Athribis)	O6 X1 O1 D21 Q3 M17 M17 X1 H8 O49		9th	Repyt	Wannina	Triphieion, Tripheion	Distinct from Hut-hery-ib (Athribis)
Tjebu (Qau)	Tb Tb W W niwt		10th	Nemty (cult center)	Qaw el-Kebir	Djew-Qa, Antaeopolis	Capital of its nome
Shashotep (Hypselis)	M8 O34 R4 O49		11th	Khnum	Shutb	Apotheke	Capital of its nome
Per-Nemty (Hieracon)			12th	Nemty	al Atawla	Hierakon	Capital of its nome
Zawty (Asyut)	O34 G39 w t O49		13th	Anubis (cult center), Wepwawet (cult center)	Asyut	Sauty, Syut, Syowt, Lycopolis, Lycon, Lyco	Capital of its nome
Qis (Cusae)	N29 M17 S29 O49		14th	Hathor	el-Qusiya	Kis, Kusai	Capital of its nome
Akhetaten (Amarna)	N27 i t n N5 O49	around 1346 BC	14th	Aten (cult center)	Tell el-Amarna		Capital of Egypt during Akhenaten's reign
Khemenu (Hermopolis Magna)	Z1 Z1 Z1 Z1 Z1 Z1 Z1 Z1 W24 O49		15th	Thoth (cult center), Ogdoad	El Ashmunein	Hermopolis Megale, Hermupolis	Capital of its nome
Herwer (Herwer)	D2 D21 Z7 Aa19 N31 D21 O49		16th	Khnum and Heqet	Hur		Capital of its nome
Hebenu (Hebenu)	V28 D58 N35 W24 Z7 D40 O49		16th		Kom el Ahmar		Capital of its nome before Herwer
Per-Imen-mat-khent(j) (Akoris)		earlier than Old Kingdom	16th		Tihna el-Gebel	Mer-nefer(et), Dehenet	
Saka (Cynopolis)	Aa18 Z1 kA D53 t niwt		17th	Anubis (cult center)	El Kays	Hardai, Cynopolis Superior	Capital of its nome
Tayu-djayet (El Hiba)	t A i i w DA i i t niwt		18th		El Hiba	Teudjoi, Ankyronpolis	Capital of its nome
Per-Medjed (Oxyrhynchus)	pr Z1 G20 D N31 niwt		19th		el-Bahnasa	Pemdje, Oxyrrhynkhoupolis	Capital of its nome
Henen-nesut (Herakleopolis Magna)	M23 A17 A17 A17 X1 O49	earlier than 3000 BC	20th	Heryshaf (cult center)	Ihnasiyyah al-Madinah	Nenj-neswt, Ehnasya, Hnas, Ahnas	Capital of the 9th and 10th Dynasties; capital of its nome
Itjtawy (Itjtawy)		~1920 BC	20th or 21st			Amenemhat-itj-tawyolis	Capital of the 12th and 13th Dynasties; still unlocated
Shedet (Crocodilopolis)	F30 D46 X1 O49		21st	Sobek (cult center)	Faiyum	Arsinoë, Fayoum, She-resy	Capital of its nome
Ta may Sobek neb Pay pa necer aa (Soknopaiou Nesos)			21st	Sobek (as Soknopaios)	Dimeh es-Seba (Arabic: ديمة السباع)	tȝ mȝy Sbk nb Pay pȝ nṯr ʿȝ	
Tepihu (Aphroditopolis)	t p I10 h w O49		22nd	Hathor (cult center during Greek period)	Atfih	Petpeh	Capital of its nome

== Nubia ==
Town (popular name)	In hieroglyphs	Date founded	Nome	Patron deity	Modern name	Other name/s	Note
Chenem-Waset (Amara West)		During Seti I's reign	none		Amara, Nubia	Per-Menmaatre, Per-Rameses-meri-Amun	Official residence of the representative of Kush
Iken (Mirgissa)	M17 A2 q n N25	earlier than 4500 BC	none	Hathor			Fortress town; now submerged in Lake Nasser
Buhen (Buhen)	D58 O4 N35 N25	earlier than 3000 BC	none		Buhen		Largest fortress town in Nubia; housed a copper factory

== Red Sea Coast ==
Town (popular name)	In hieroglyphs	Date founded	Nome	Patron deity	Modern name	Other name/s	Note
Berenice (Berenice)	SA i s Hr r t t xAst	275 BC	none		Medinet-el Haras	Berenike, Berenice Troglodytica, Baranis	Founded by Ptolemy II; named after his mother, Berenice I of Egypt
Tao (Leucus Limen)		earlier than New Kingdom	none		El Qoseir	Leucus Limen, Kosseir, Al Qusair, El Quseir, Qusseir, Qosseir	Important trading port during pharaonic times, where goods from Red Sea and beyond entered Egypt

== See also ==
- Nome
- List of cities and towns in Egypt
