= Khaset (nome) =

Territorial division in ancient Egypt

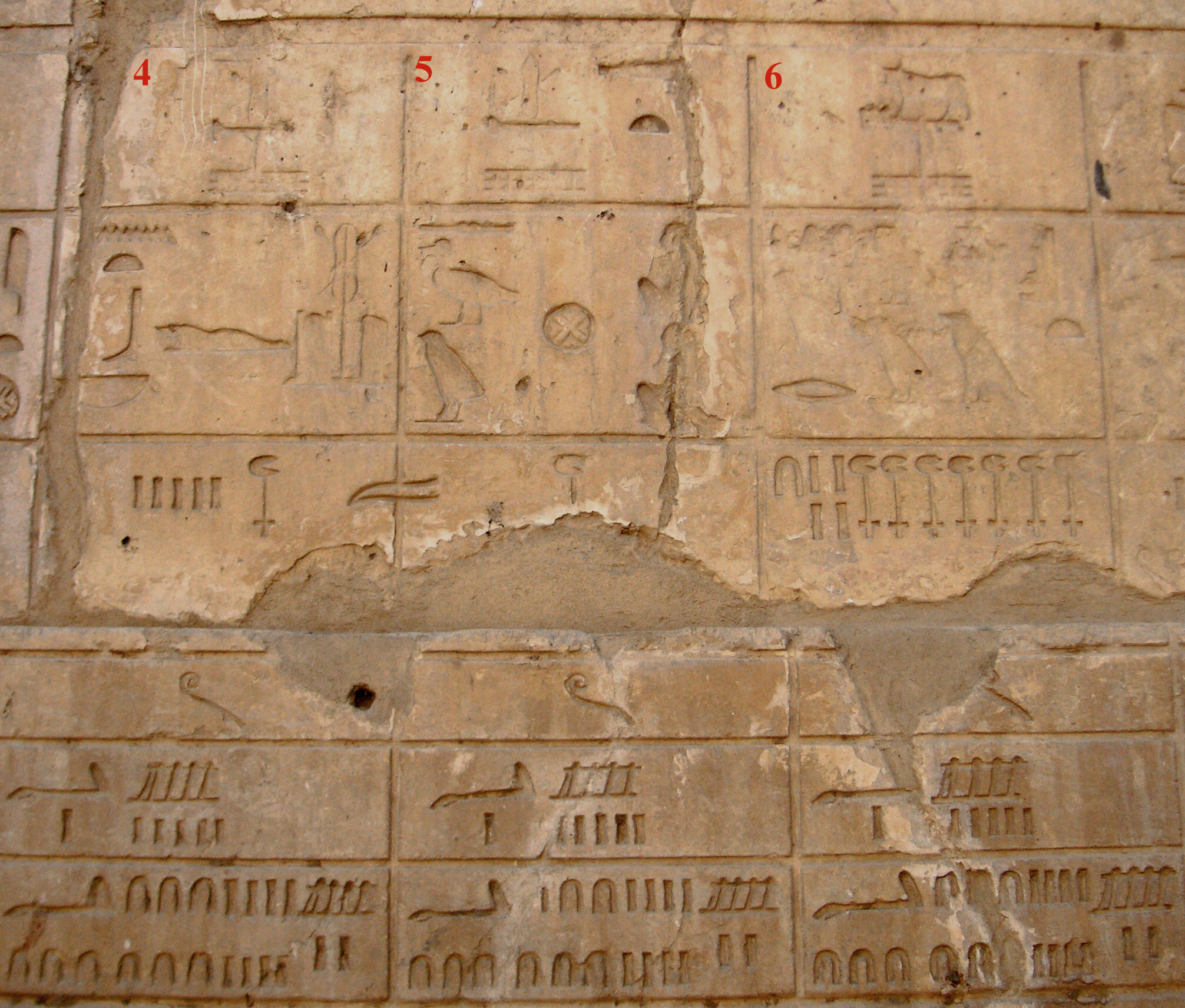
Khaset, nome 6 at the "White Chapel" in Karnak

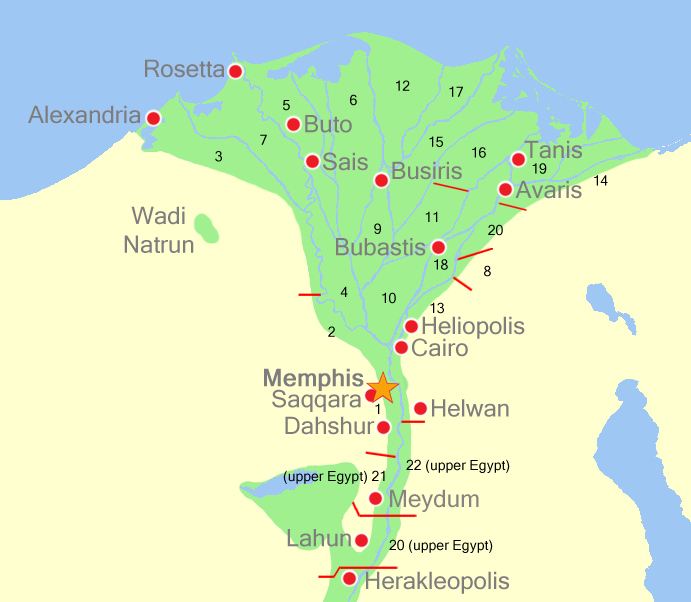
Map of all nomes in Lower Egypt

Khaset (Mountain bull, also Chasuu) was one of 42 nomes (administrative division) in ancient Egypt, specifically it was the 6th Nome of lower Egypt.

N26 E2 R12 N24
Khaset
in hieroglyphs

== Geography ==
Khaset was one of the 20 nomes in Lower Egypt and had district number 6.

The area of the district is not readable, usually the nomes were about 30–40 km (18–24 miles) in length and their area depending on the depth of the Nile valley and the beginning of the desert. The area was calculated in cha-ta (1 cha-ta equals roughly 2.75 hectare / 2.4 acres) and the distance was calculated in iteru (1 iteru equals roughly 10.5 km / 6.2 miles) in length.

The Niwt (main city) was Khasu/Xois (part of modern Sakha) and among other cities were Per-Wadjet/Buto (modern Tell el-Farain). Per-Wadjet was sometimes also part of the Sap-Meh nome.

== History ==
Every nome was ruled by a nomarch (provincial governor) who answered directly to the pharaoh.

Every niwt had a Het net (temple) dedicated to the chief deity and a Heqa het (nomarch's residence).

The district's main deities were Wadjet and Ra. Other major deities in the area included Isis and Osiris. Today the area is part of the Gharbia Governorate.
