= Cynopolis =

Coordinates: 28.4833°N 30.7833°E

- Town
- Etymology: "City of the dog"
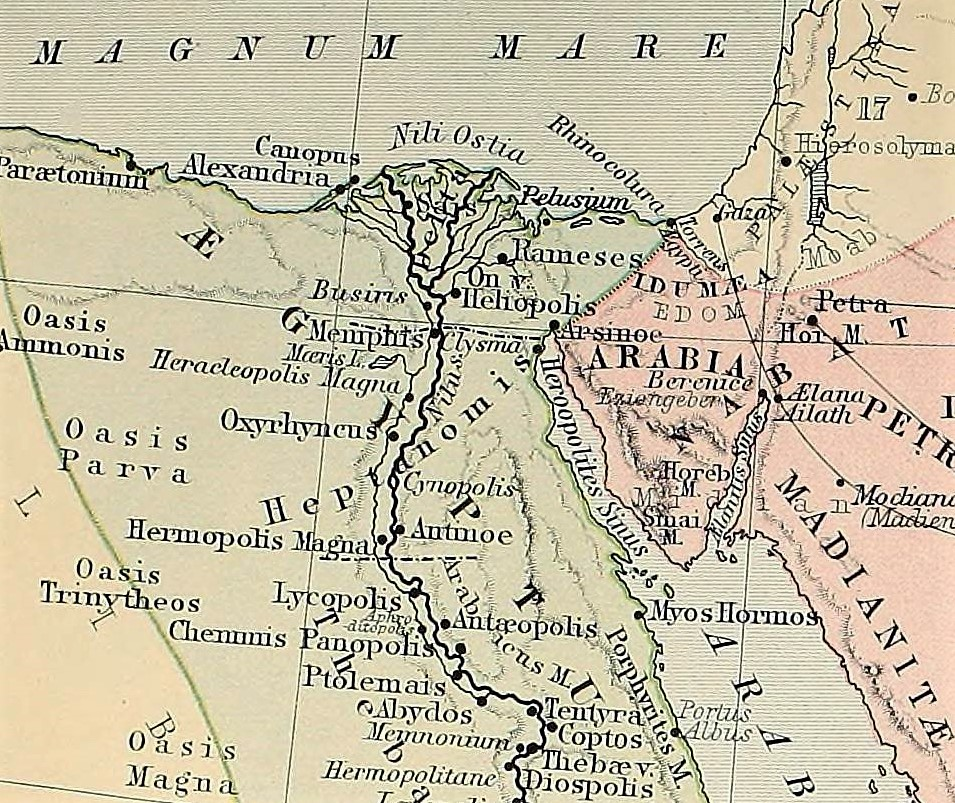
- A map of Ancient Egypt

Cynopolis (Greek: Κυνόπολις and Κυνῶν πόλις for "city of the dog") was the Hellenistic toponym for two cities in ancient Egypt. Both Cynopolis superior and Cynopolis inferior were bishoprics in Christian times.

== Cynopolis superior ==
Aa18 Z1 kA D53 t niwt or Aa18 Z1 kA Z1 D53 E1 niwt
Sꜣkꜣ
in hieroglyphs

Cynopolis was the Greek name for the ancient Egyptian town of Saka (or Hardai?); (Coptic: Ⲕⲁⲓⲥ or Ⲕⲟⲉⲓⲥ) in the seventeenth nome of Upper Egypt, was home to the cult of Anubis, a canine-shaped deity. According to Claudius Ptolemy, the town was situated on an island in the river. The modern settlement of El Kays now stands on the site. The nome of Cynopolis extended to both banks of the Nile.

A burial ground for dogs was discovered on the opposite bank of the Nile, near Hamatha. The neighbouring cities were rivals according to Plutarch, who wrote (De Iside, 72) that when a Cynopolis resident ate an Oxyrhynchos fish, the people of Oxyrhynchos started attacking dogs in revenge, which resulted in a minor civil war.

Cynopolis was destroyed by the viceroy of Nubia Pinehesy during the reign of Ramses XI: the survivors were enslaved.

The diocese, which became obscure under Islam, was nominally restored in 1933 as a Latin Catholic titular bishopric. It was named Cynopolis in Aegypto. The see has been vacant for several decades, having had the following incumbents, both of the lowest (episcopal) rank:

- Giacomo Eich, Oblates of St. Francis de Sales (O.S.F.S.) (1942.04.21 – 1947.02.04)
- Joseph Gerald Holland, Society of African Missions (S.M.A.) (1953.05.07 – 1970.12.07)

== Cynopolis inferior ==
There was a second Cynopolis, referred to as Cynopolis Inferior or Cynum, which was located in the Busirite nome in Lower Egypt (the Nile delta), now modern Meniet ebn Kasib. It was a suffragan bishopric of Oxyrhynchus, the Metropolitan Archbishopric and provincial capital of the Late Roman province of Arcadia Aegypti.

The diocese was nominally restored in 1922 as a Latin Catholic titular bishopric under the name Cynopolis. In 1933 the name of the see was changed to Cynopolis in Arcadia. The see has been vacant for several decades. The incumbents from 1922 to 1968 were:

- Robert Dobson (1922.08.22 – 1942.01.06)
- Angel Maria Ocampo Berrio, Jesuits (S.J.) (1942.06.23 – 1947.07.19) as Coadjutor Bishop of Socorro y San Gil (Colombia) (1942.06.23 – 1947.07.19), succeeding as bishop (1947.07.19 – 1950.12.06), later Bishop of Tunja (Colombia) (1950.12.06 – 1964.06.20), promoted first Metropolitan Archbishop of Tunja (1964.06.20 – 1970.02.20), on emeritate Titular Archbishop of Castulo (1970.02.20 – 1973.03.10)
- Joseph Zhang Run-bo (張潤波) (1947.11.20 – 1949.08.10)
- Jean-Marcel Rodié (1956.02.15 – 1968.04.10)
