= A-bt =

Nome of Ancient Egypt

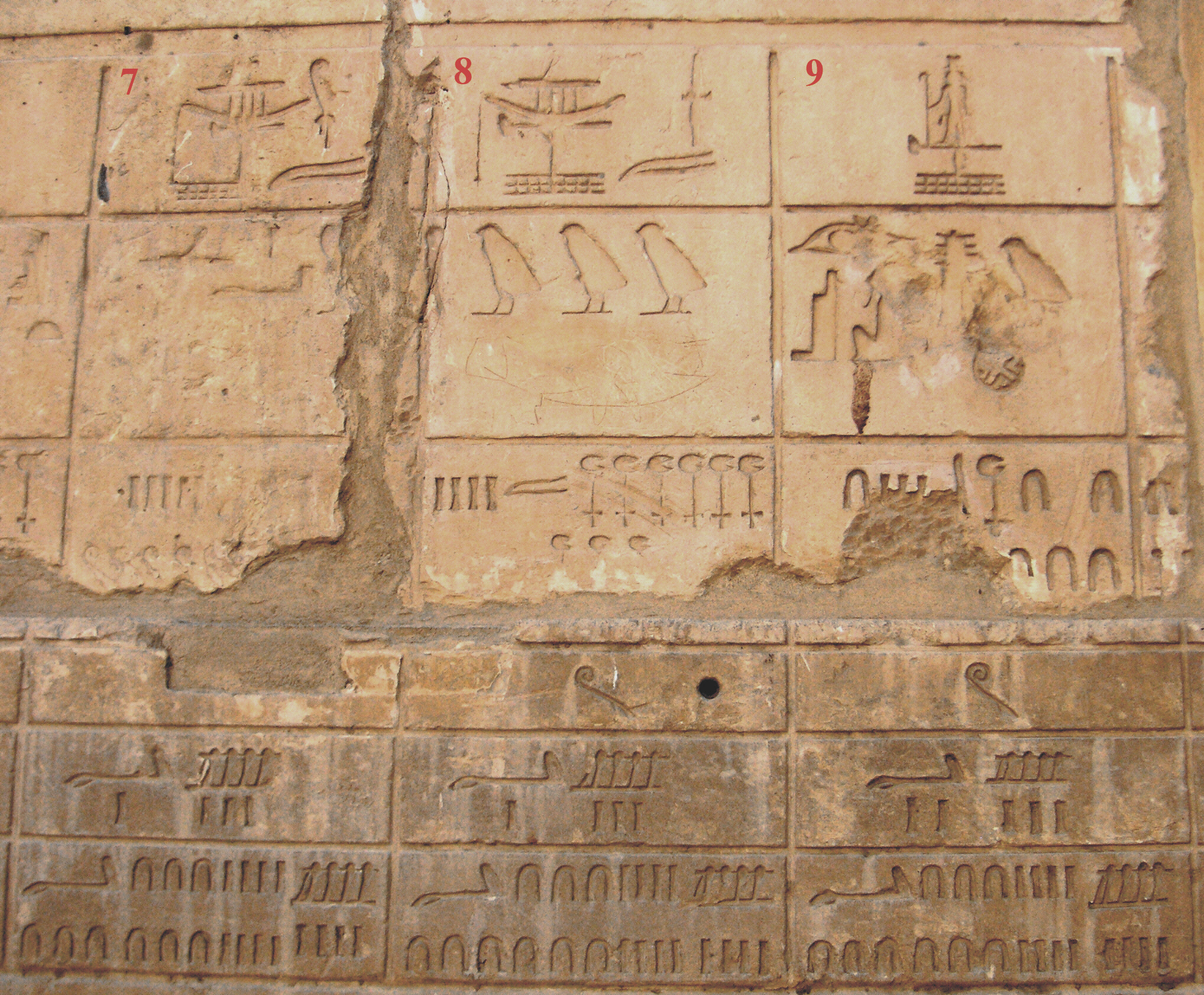
A-bt, nome 8 on the wall of the White Chapel in Karnak.

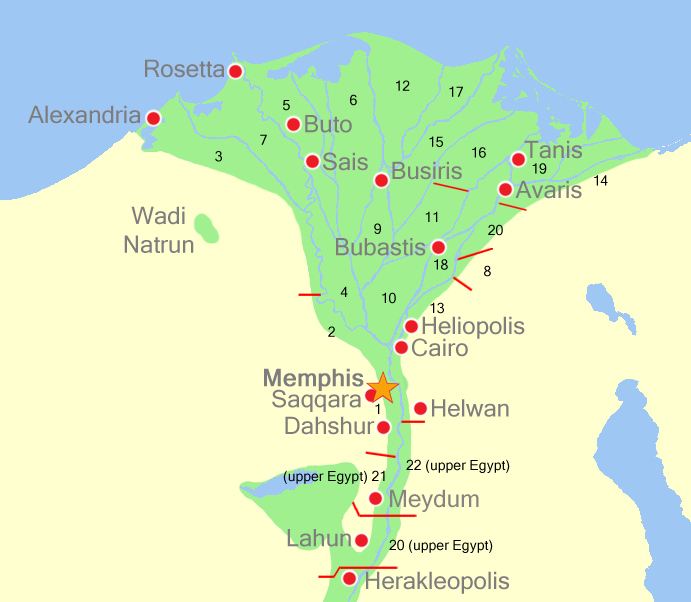
Map of the nome in Lower Egypt.

A-bt ("The West Spear", also Hui-ges iabti) was one of the 42 nome (administrative districts) in Ancient Egypt, specifically it was the 8th Nome of lower Egypt.,

T21 R15 R12 N24
A-bt
in hieroglyphs

== Geography ==
A-bt was one of the 20 nome in Lower Egypt and had district number 8. The area of the district was approximately 6 cha-ta (about 18.0 hectares, with 1 cha-ta equivalent to 2.75 ha) with a length of about 4 iteru (approximately 42 km, with 1 iteru equal to 10.5 km).

Niwt (the capital) was Per Tem/Hermopolis (near present-day Tell el-Maschuta), and other major towns included Piemro/Naukratis (today's Kom Gieif).

Hermopolis was previously part of Sap-Res, the 4th nome in Lower Egypt.

In the White Chapel, nome 8 and nome 7 are mentioned together as the western and eastern parts of the same district.

== History ==
Each nome was governed by a nomarch who officially answered directly to the pharaoh.

Each Niwt had a Het net (temple) dedicated to the area's protective deity and a Heqa het (the residence of the nomarch).

The protective deity of the district was Atum, and among other gods, Osiris was primarily worshipped.

Today, the area is part of the Governorate of Ismailia.
