= Pachnamunis =

Town of ancient Egypt

Pachnamunis (Ancient Greek: Παχναμουνίς or Παχνευμουνίς or Παχνεμόης) was a major town of the nome of Sebennytos in the Egyptian Delta. It stood at approximately latitude 31° 6′ North on the eastern shore of Lake Butos. It was destroyed by the Ottoman Caliphate and is now called al-Kafr al-Sharqi.

== See also ==
- List of ancient Egyptian towns and cities
