= Inebu-hedj =

Nome of Ancient Egypt

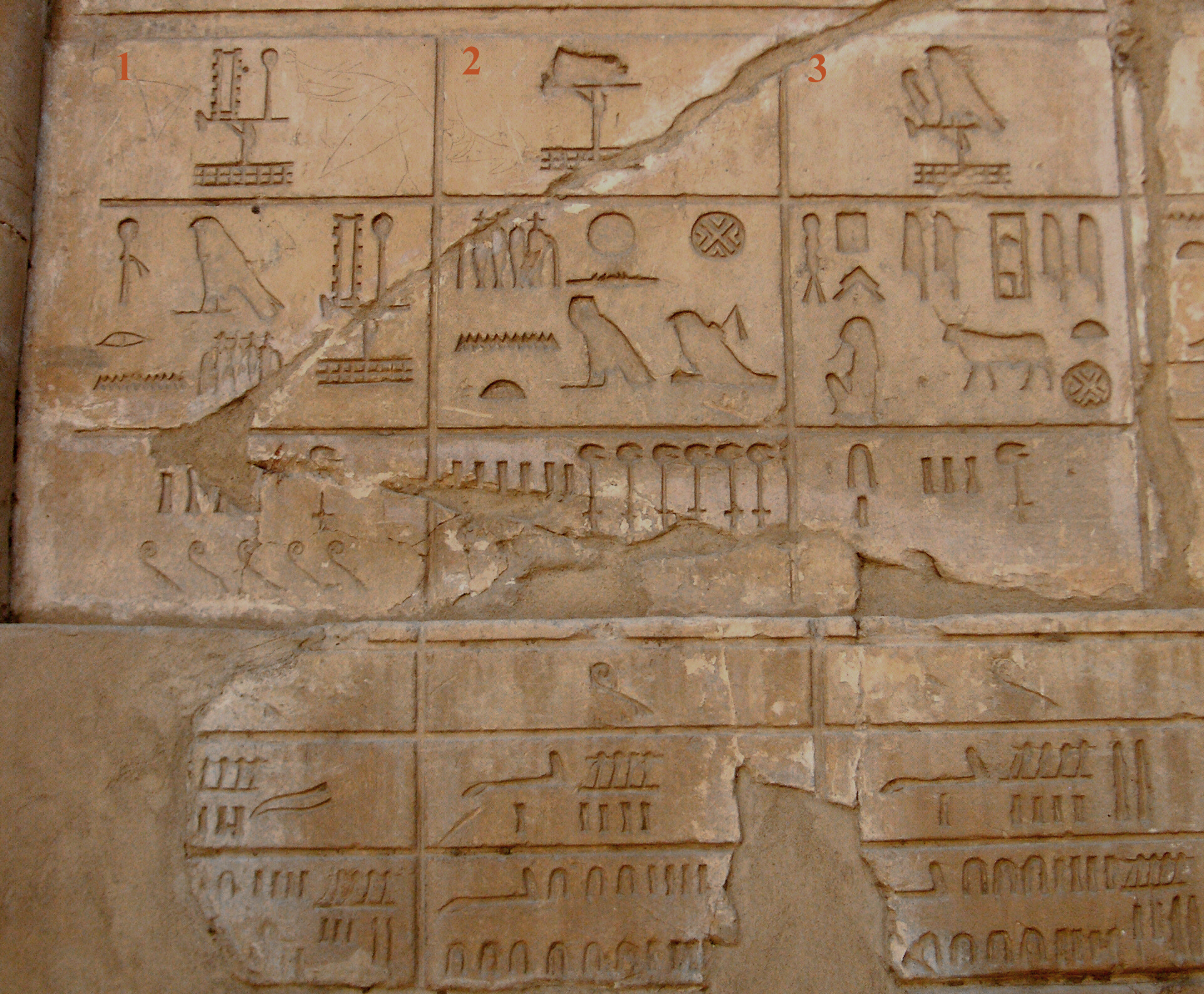
Inebu-hedj, nome 1 at the "White Chapel" in Karnak

Inebu-hedj (White Walls, also Inbu-Hedj, White fortress) was one of 42 nomes (administrative division) in Ancient Egypt; specifically, it was the 1st Nome of lower Egypt. It took its name after the city built during the reign of pharaoh Menes around 3100 BCE.

O36 T3 R12 N24
Inebu-hedj
in hieroglyphs

== Geography ==
Northern Ancient Egypt was known as mḥw, which means "north". Inebu-hedj was one of the 20 nomes in Lower Egypt and it was designated as district number 1, the primary district.

The Niwt (main city) was Menefer or Memphis (part of modern Mit Rahina). Saqqara was among the other cities of the region.

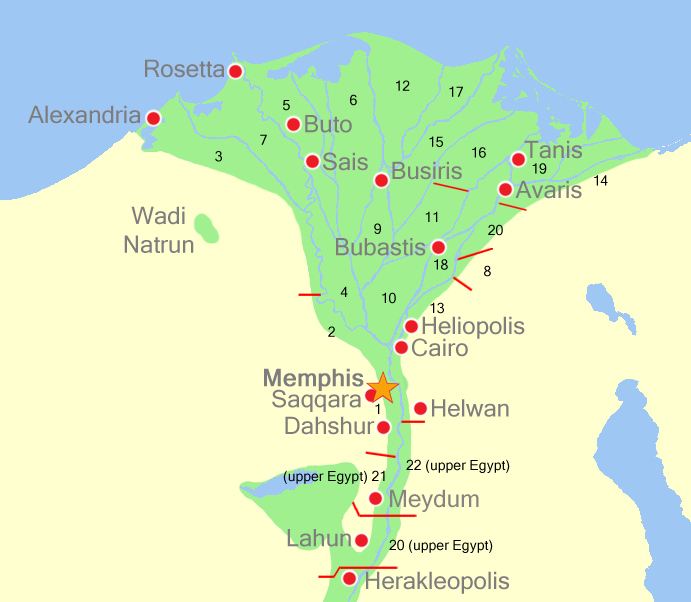
Map of all nomes in Lower Egypt

== History ==
Every nome was ruled by a nomarch (provincial governor) who answered directly to the king.

Every niwt had a Hut netjer (temple) dedicated to the chief deity as well as a Heqa hut (nomarch's residence).

The main deity of the district was Horus. Apis, Hathor, Isis, Nefertem, Ptah, Seker, and Sekhmet were among others worshiped as major deities in the nome.

As of 2017, the area is part of the Cairo Governorate.
