= Lower Egypt =

Northernmost region of Egypt

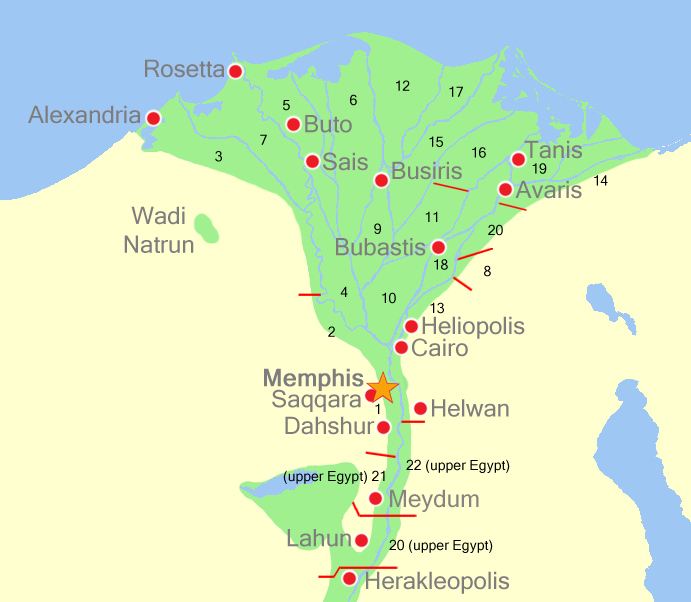
Map of Lower Egypt

Lower Egypt (Arabic: مصر السفلى Miṣr as-Suflā) is the northernmost portion of Egypt, which consists of the fertile Nile Delta between Upper Egypt and the Mediterranean Sea. Lower Egypt is characterized by its rich agricultural lands and strategic location and it played a pivotal role in the rise of ancient Egyptian civilization. Lower Egypt was divided into nomes and it has served as an important center of cultural, economic, and political activity in Egypt for thousands of years.

== Name ==
In Ancient Egyptian, Lower Egypt was known as mḥw which means "north". Later on, during Antiquity and the Middle Ages, Greeks and Romans called it Κάτω Αἴγυπτος or Aegyptus Inferior both meaning "Lower Egypt", but Copts carried on using the old name related to the north – Tsakhet (Coptic: ⲧⲥⲁϧⲏⲧ) or Psanemhit (Coptic: ⲡⲥⲁⲛⲉⲙϩⲓⲧ) meaning the "Northern part". It was further divided into a number of regions or nomes (Coptic: ⲡⲧⲟϣ, romanized: ptosh) – Niphaiat (Coptic: ⲛⲓⲫⲁⲓⲁⲧ, lit. 'Libyan (nome)', Ancient Greek: Μαρεωτης) in the west, Tiarabia (Coptic: ϯⲁⲣⲁⲃⲓⲁ, lit. 'Arabia') in the east, Nimeshshoti (Coptic: ⲛⲓⲙⲉϣϣⲟϯ, lit. 'fields') in the north-east and Bashmur (Bashmuric Coptic: ⲡⲥⲁⲙⲏⲣ, lit. 'sand shore') in the north. Champollion adds another region in the middle of the Delta which he calls Petmour (Coptic: ⲡⲉⲧⲙⲟⲩⲣ, lit. 'the one which bounds, girds') based on Ancient Greek: Πτιμυρις mentioned by Stephanus of Byzantium, but it is unclear if this is a separate region or just a Greek rendering of the name Bashmur.

After the Muslim conquest, the middle part of the Delta was called al-Rif (Arabic: الريف) which means "countryside, rural area" and which is derived from Ancient Egyptian

r Z1 pr Z1 niwt

r-pr, "temple", because the rural areas were administered by them. The eastern part roughly comprising the ancient Tiarabia was called al-Hawf (Arabic: الهوف) meaning "edge, fringe".

== Geography ==
Today, there are two principal channels that the Nile takes through the river delta: one in the west at Rashid and one in the east at Damietta.

The delta region is well watered, crisscrossed by channels and canals.

Owing primarily to its proximity to the Mediterranean Sea, the climate in Lower Egypt is milder than that of Upper Egypt, the southern portion of the country. Temperatures are less extreme and rainfall is more abundant in Lower Egypt.

== History ==
Lower Egypt
- Deshret
- Capital: Memphis
- Common languages: Ancient Egyptian
- Religion: Ancient Egyptian religion
- Government: Monarchy
- King
  - Unknown: Unknown (first)
  - c. 3150 BC: possibly Wash (last)
Preceded by	Succeeded by
Prehistoric Egypt	Early Dynastic Period (Egypt)
- Today part of: Egypt

It was divided into twenty districts called nomes, the first of which was at el-Lisht. Because Lower Egypt was mostly undeveloped scrubland, filled with all types of plant life such as grasses and herbs, the organization of the nomes underwent several changes.

The capital of Lower Egypt was Memphis. Its patron goddess was the goddess Wadjet, depicted as a cobra. Lower Egypt was represented by the Red Crown Deshret, and its symbols were the papyrus and the bee. After unification, the patron deities of both Lower Egypt and Upper Egypt were represented together as the Two Ladies, Wadjet and Nekhbet (depicted as a vulture), to protect all of the ancient Egyptians.

By approximately 3600 BC, Neolithic Egyptian societies along the Nile River had based their culture on the raising of crops and the domestication of animals. Shortly after 3600 BC, Egyptian society began to grow and advance rapidly toward refined civilization. A new and distinctive pottery, which was related to the pottery in the Southern Levant, appeared during this time and copper became more extensively used. The Mesopotamian process of sun-dried bricks, and architectural building principles—including the use of the arch and recessed walls for decorative effect—became popular during this time.

Concurrent with these cultural advances, a process of unification of the societies and towns of the upper Nile River, or Upper Egypt, occurred. At the same time, the societies of the Nile Delta, or Lower Egypt also underwent a unification process. Warfare between Upper Egypt and Lower Egypt occurred often. During his reign in Upper Egypt, King Narmer defeated his enemies in the Delta and merged the kingdoms of Upper Egypt and Lower Egypt under his single rule.

== List of kings of the Predynastic Period of Lower Egypt ==
The Palermo stone, a royal annal written in the mid Fifth Dynasty (c. 2490 BC – c. 2350 BC) records a number of kings reigning over Lower Egypt before Narmer. These are completely unattested outside these inscriptions:

Name
Hsekiu
Khayu
Tiu
Thesh
Neheb
Wazner
Mekh
(destroyed)

In contrast, the following kings are attested through archeological finds from Sinai and Lower Egypt: Double Falcon, Crocodile.

On the Narmer Palette commemorating the defeat of Lower Egypt and the unification of the two kingdoms, the male figure depicted being bluedgeoned by Narmer is given the name "Wash". As it is uncertain whether the figure represents an actual person or is simply an allegorical representation, archaeological evidence for supporting "Wash" as the final king of Lower Egypt is tenuous.

== List of nomes ==
Number	Egyptian Name	Capital	Modern name of capital site	English Translation	God
1	Inebu-hedj	Ineb Hedj / Men-nefer / Menfe (Memphis)	Mit Rahina	White Walls	Ptah
2	Khensu	Khem (Letopolis)	Ausim	Cow's thigh	Horus
3	Imnt	Imu (Apis)	Kom el-Hisn	West	Hathor
4	Zapi-Res	Ptkheka	Tanta	Southern shield	Sobek, Isis, Amun
5	Zapi-Meh	Zau (Sais)	Sa el-Hagar	Northern shield	Neith
6	Khaset	Khasu (Xois)	Sakha	Mountain bull	Amun-Ra
7	A-ment	(Hermopolis Parva, Metelis)	Damanhur	West harpoon	Hu
8	A-bt	Tjeku / Per-Atum (Heroonpolis, Pithom)	Tell el-Maskhuta	East harpoon	Atum
9	Ati	Djed (Busiris)	Abu Sir Bara	Andjeti	Osiris
10	Ka-khem	Hut-hery-ib (Athribis)	Banha (Tell Atrib)	Black bull	Horus
11	Ka-heseb	Taremu (Leontopolis)	Tell el-Urydam	Heseb bull	Isis
12	Theb-ka	Tjebnutjer (Sebennytos)	Samanud	Calf and Cow	Onuris
13	Heq-At	Iunu (Heliopolis)	Materiya (suburb of Cairo)	Prospering Sceptre	Ra
14	Khent-abt	Tjaru (Sile, Tanis)	Tell Abu Sefa	Eastmost	Horus
15	Tehut	Ba'h / Weprehwy (Hermopolis Parva)	Baqliya	Ibis	Thoth
16	Kha	Djedet (Mendes)	Tell el-Rubˁ	Fish	Banebdjedet, or Hatmehyt
17	Semabehdet	Semabehdet (Diospolis Inferior)	Tell el-Balamun	The throne	Amun-Ra
18	Am-Khent	Per-Bastet (Bubastis)	Tell Bastah (near Zagazig)	Prince of the South	Bastet
19	Am-Pehu	Dja'net (Leontopolis Tanis)	Tell Nebesha or San el-Hagar	Prince of the North	Uatchet
20	Sopdu	Per-Sopdu	Saft el-Hinna	Plumed Falcon	Sopdet

== See also ==
- Upper Egypt
- Middle Egypt
- Upper and Lower Egypt
- Nomes of Egypt
- Geography of Egypt
- Ancient Egypt
