= Letopolis =

Human settlement

Letopolis Λητοῦς Πόλις ⲟⲩϣⲏⲙ, ⲃⲟⲩϣⲏⲙ اوسيم
- City
- Location within Egypt
- Coordinates: 30°07′N 31°08′E
- Country: Egypt

Area
  - Total: 72.41 km^{2} (27.96 sq mi)
- Elevation: 12 m (39 ft)

Population (2023)
  - Total: 430,609
  - Density: 5,947/km^{2} (15,400/sq mi)

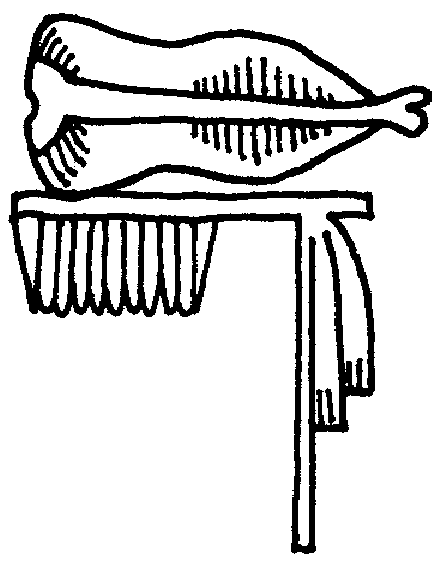
Standard of the Letopolite nome

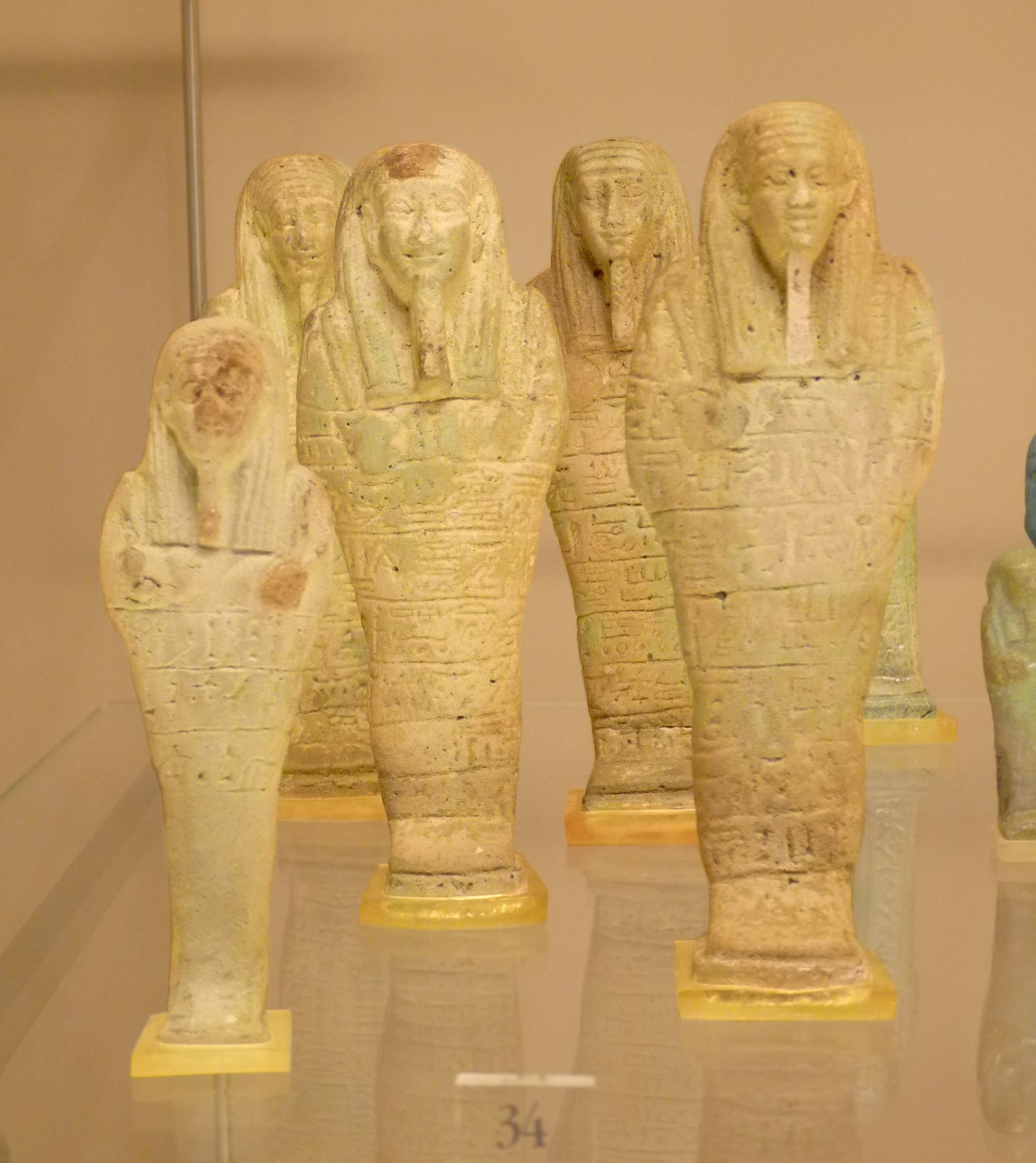
Five faience ushabti of Ankh-hapi, a priest in Letopolis during the Ptolemaic dynasty. Bologna, Museo Civico Archeologico

Letopolis (Greek: Λητοῦς Πόλις) was an ancient Egyptian city, the capital of the second nome of Lower Egypt. Its Egyptian name was Khem 𓋊𓐍𓐝𓂜𓊖𓉐 (ḫm), and the modern site of its remains is known as Ausim (Arabic: اوسيم, from Coptic: ⲟⲩϣⲏⲙ, ⲃⲟⲩϣⲏⲙ). The city was a center of worship of the deity Khenty-irty or Khenti-kheti, a form of the god Horus. The site and its deity are mentioned in texts from as far back as the Old Kingdom (c. 2686–2181 BC), and a temple to the god probably stood there very early in Egyptian history. The only known monuments at the site, however, date to the reigns of pharaohs from the Late Period (664–332 BC): Necho II, Psamtik II, Hakor, and Nectanebo I.

== In popular culture ==
Letopolis is depicted in the 2017 video game Assassin's Creed Origins, set during the last years of the Ptolemaic Era of Egypt, as having been "rediscovered" and used as a base by one of the game's antagonists, Taharqa. Also known as "The Scarab", Taharqa seeks to redevelop the formerly abandoned city and have it become his own "great work", but he is therein opposed by militant worshippers of the goddess Sekhmet, to whom Letopolis was surrendered ages ago as a propitiatory offering.

== Bibliogrophy ==
- Porter, Bertha, and Rosalind L. B. Moss (1934). Topographical Bibliography of Ancient Egyptian Hieroglyphic Texts, Reliefs, and Paintings, Part IV: Lower and Middle Egypt. Oxford: Griffith Institute. See the entry for Ausim (Letopolis), p. 68.
- Leclère, François (2008). Les villes de Basse Égypte au Ier millénaire av. J.-C. 2 vols. Cairo: Institut français d'archéologie orientale.
- Wilkinson, Richard H. (2000). The Complete Temples of Ancient Egypt. London: Thames & Hudson.
- Helck, Wolfgang, and Eberhard Otto (eds.) (1975–1992). Lexikon der Ägyptologie. Wiesbaden: Harrassowitz. See the entry on Letopolis (Khem).
- Spedding, James; et al. (2025). "The Nile Delta during the Early Dynastic and Old Kingdom periods". Journal of African Archaeology, 23(1), pp. 53–77.
- Wilkinson, Toby A. H. (1999). Early Dynastic Egypt. London: Routledge.

== See also ==
- List of ancient Egyptian towns and cities
