= Heliopolite Nome =

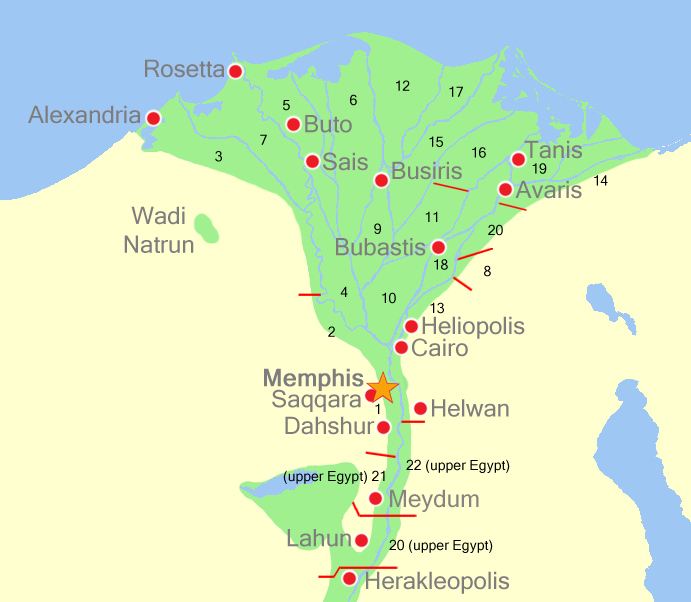
The Nomes of Lower Egypt.

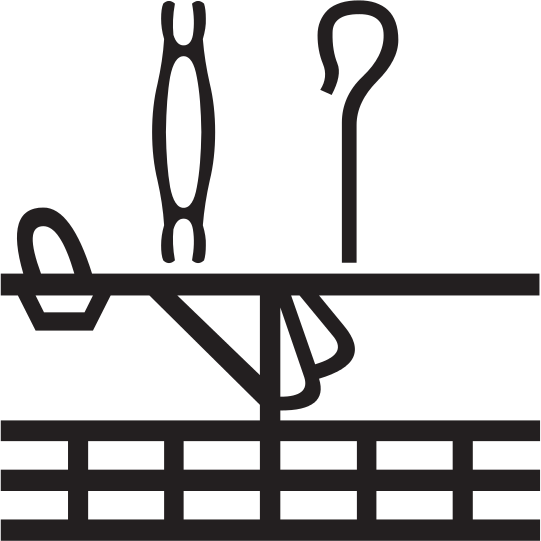
The "prospering scepter" in hieroglyphs

The Heliopolite, or Thirteenth Nome (Egyptian: ḥqꜣ-ꜥḏ, lit. "Prospering Scepter"), was a nome (province or district) of ancient Egypt. Its capital was Iunu, which was the Heliopolis of the Ptolemaic era and the modern Ayn Shams (a suburb of Cairo). The district formed part of Lower Egypt.
