= Kom el-Hisn =

Site in Nile Delta, Egypt

Kom el-Hisn كوم الحصن
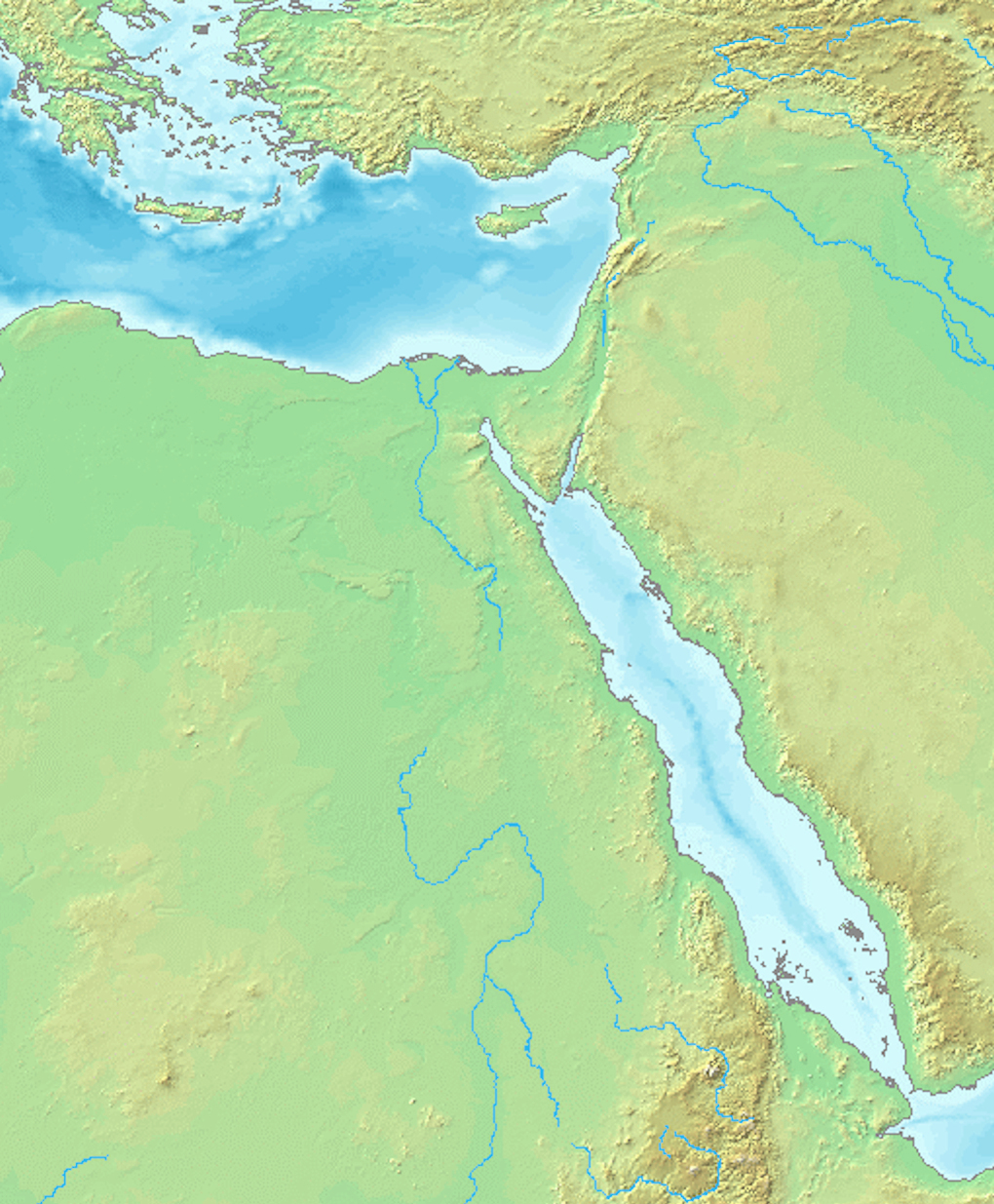
- Location in Egypt Kom el-Hisn (Egypt) Kom el-Hisn (Northeast Africa)
- Coordinates: 30.7955°N 30.6004°E
- Country: Lower Egypt

M1 M1 M1 niwt
jmꜣw
in hieroglyphs
Era: Middle Kingdom
(2055–1650 BC)

pr Z1 nb M1 M1 M1 niwt
pr nb jmꜣw
in hieroglyphs
Era: Late Period
(664–332 BC)

Kom el-Hisn (Arabic: كوم الحصن Kawm el-Ḥiṣn) is a Nile Delta settlement dating back to the Old Kingdom of Egypt with parts dating to the Middle Kingdom. Its location in the 3rd nome of Lower Egypt, or "House of the Lord of Ships (pr nb jmu)", focus on the goddess Hathor, as well as faunal and textual evidence suggests it played a role in transporting cattle between regions. Whether or not it was a self-sufficient town or built solely to support the temple is currently unknown.

The site's main findings include the Tomb of Khesuwer, a large necropolis, and a temple dedicated to Sekhmet-Hathor. Inscriptions designating Hathor as the "Mistress of Imu", among other similar inscriptions, and the location of Kom el-Hisn have given evidence to the site being the former nome capital Yamu, or Imu. Much of the information on this site from previous excavations is lost or remains unpublished.

== Excavation history ==
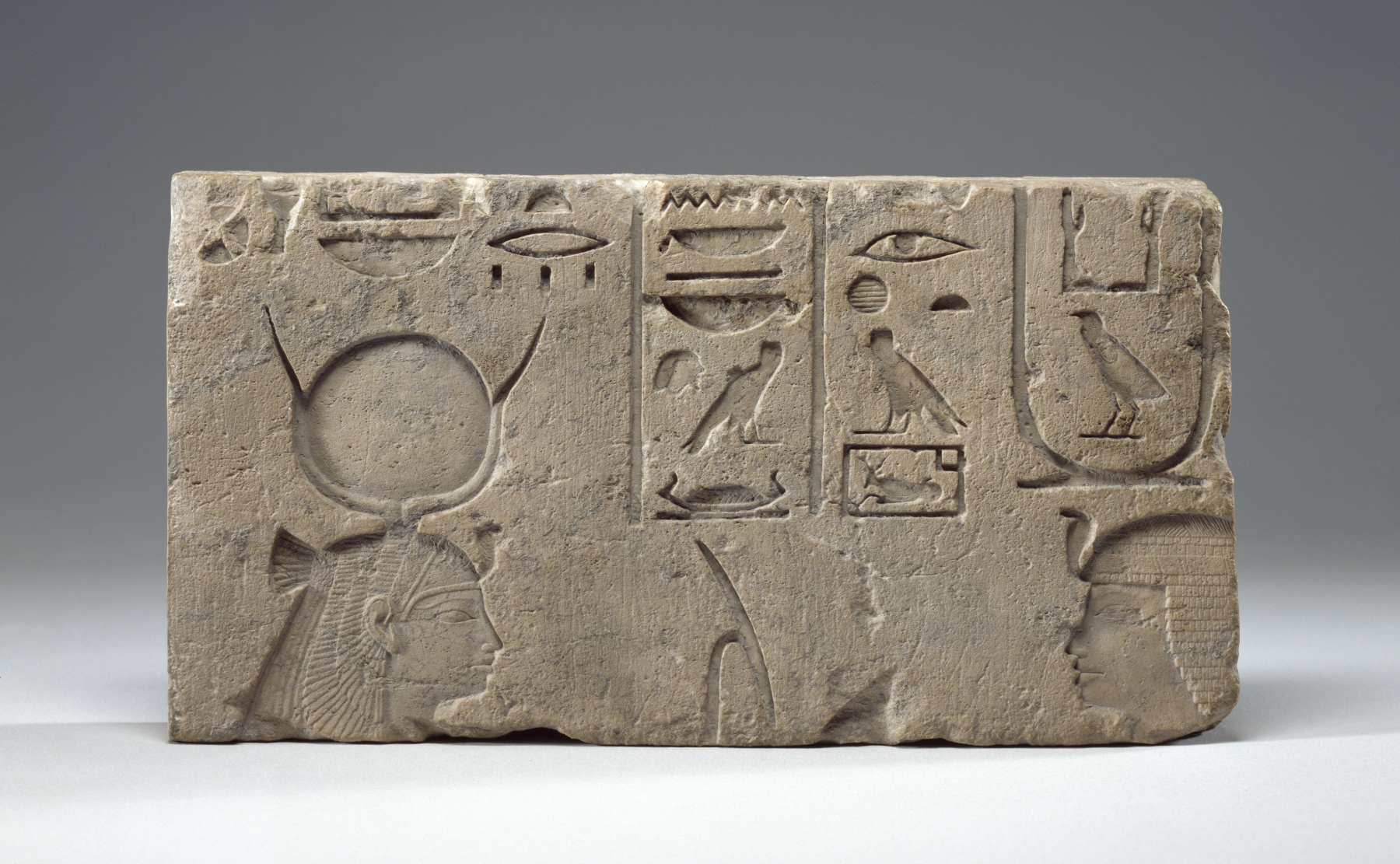
Relief with Hathor and pharaoh Necho II, from Kom el-Hisn. Walters Art Museum

The site was initially uncovered by Flinders Petrie during his excavation at Naukratis in 1881. It was then surveyed by Francis Llewellyn Griffith from 1885 to 1887. This survey captured the remains of a mudbrick temple, enclosure wall, and four statues of Ramesses II. Two of these statues had inscriptions dedicating them to Sekhmet-Hathor, "Mistress of Imu". The temple and enclosure wall have since been destroyed. Currently, two of the statues of Ramesses II are still at the site. One has been moved to the Cairo Museum.

Another survey in 1902, this time by Georges Daressy, found more artifacts related to Ramesses II such as two broken colossi of Amenemhat III later usurped by Ramesses II, and four blocks originally inscribed for Ramesses II, but later usurped by Shoshenq II and reused for a chapel.

In 1910 the Tomb of Khesuwer, a priest of Hathor, was found and excavated by Campbell Cowan Edgar. Within, a stone head of a 12th Dynasty Pharaoh was found wearing the white crown of Upper Egypt. A damaged statue group of Amenemhat III was also found, possibly related to the broken colossi found earlier. This tomb cements the presence of a cult of Hathor at the site as well its possible religious function.

In the early 1940s, mudbrick tombs were uncovered after a heavy rainfall. From 1943 to 1949, El-Amir, Farad, and Hamada excavated what turned out to be a large necropolis. Over one thousand graves were found, ranging from lower to upper-class burials. The most common were simple sand-pit burials. Among these, blades were discovered in some of the tombs labeled the “warrior group,” but most burials contained few or no grave goods. The 1946 and 1948 excavations revealed a large number of "pot-burials" containing the remains of children. Among these, family tombs or mass graves, mostly containing children, were also found. These were identified by the length of necklaces found with the remains.

The exact number of graves is unknown. The majority date to the First Intermediate Period and Middle Kingdom. This excavation was not fully published and excluded a number of possible Roman graves. No maps or field notes from this excavation survive and much of what survives has remained unpublished.

A study of fauna and flora remains from residential deposits was completed in 1988. Considering the Nile Delta's historical association with cattle production, the small amount of cattle bones found suggests the site still had some affiliation with cattle production and the overall Estate, but not including butchering or raising cattle. A majority of their food appears to come from pigs, with remains indicating consumption of pigs outnumbering that of sheep and goats. This number suggests the site was not heavily involved in grain production. Cow bones found on the north end of the site suggests an animal necropolis, giving further evidence to the relation between the presence of the Hathor cult and involvement in the cattle production of the Nile Delta. This has not been excavated.

A series of excavations in 1984, 1986, and 1988 found remains of domestic architecture and materials, including an enclosure wall that had bordered much of the site. From these excavations came artifacts like bread molds and bowls that could be used for food storage, but the lack of basic items and the means to produce them suggests Kom el-Hisn was a religious settlement or ran under a governmental authority. During Robert J. Wenke's excavation in 1988, he uncovered broken sealings and ceramics dating to the 5th and 6th dynasties. The site appears to have been a settlement occupied at least to the Middle Kingdom. Though the lack of basic domestic goods gives evidence to Kom el-Hisn being occupied by the Hathor cult and a small support staff for those priests. This is again supported by Wenke's excavation in 1988, where stone tools were found but leftovers from their manufacture were rare. So far, no manufacturing workshops or evidence of such has been found, but Wenke stresses that it is still possible they existed but were removed from the main site.

=== Tomb of Khesuwer ===
One of the first major findings at the site was the 12th Dynasty limestone tomb of Khesuwer ("Khesu the Elder"). The remains were discovered on the south-west corner of Kom el-Hisn. It is the only tomb at the site containing inscriptions, which date to the Middle Kingdom. With these inscriptions and the basalt head found during the excavation, Edgar dates the tomb to the reign of Amenemhat III. Four foundation deposits were found beneath the remains of two mudbrick walls found surrounding the tomb. Each contained a limestone plaque with an inscription containing his name that matched the one found inside the tomb. By the time of the tomb's discovery, the coffin and offering left behind had turned to dust. These deposits were placed as part of a ritual during the temple's construction so finding them beneath his tomb suggests of re-use of parts of the temple to build Khesuwer's tomb.

One scene depicts Khesuwer and four rows of priestesses, who are clapping and playing instruments, giving evidence to his title as "Overseer" of the priestess' of Hathor. It is assumed his office was that of the temple found at Kom el-Hisn.

== Yamu ==
Yamu or Imu was a capital of the 3rd Nome of Lower Egypt. It is found in texts as early as the 5th Dynasty but the current location of the town is unknown. Due to the discovery of the inscription on the statues found at Kom el-Hisn, this site is thought to have been the location of Yamu.

Unpublished notes from Petrie's visit to the site in 1884 describe an offering table to the goddess Sekhmet, with an inscription that reads "the king gives an offering [to] the mistress of Yamu, Sekhmet". He also reported other inscriptions detailing the "mistress of Yamu", but is not specific about where he found them or if they refer to Kom el-Hisn. Though it is a strong theory that Yamu and Kom el-Hisn are the same, there is no concrete evidence to prove this.

== See also ==
- List of ancient Egyptian towns and cities

== Bibliography ==
- Cagle, Anthony J. (2001). The Spatial Structure of Kom El-Hisn: An Old Kingdom Town in the Western Nile Delta, Egypt. University of Washington [dissertation]: Ann Arbor, Bell and Howell Information and Learning.
- Kirby, C.J.; Orel, S.E.; Smith, S.T. (1998). "Preliminary Report on the Survey of Kom El-Hisn, 1996". The Journal of Egyptian Archaeology. 84: 23–43. doi:10.1177/030751339808400103. S2CID 165036596.
- Orel, Sara E. (2000). "A reexamination of the 1943-1952 excavations at Kom el-Hisn, Egypt". Göttinger Miszellen. 179: 39–49.
- Redding, Richard W. (1992). "Egyptian Old Kingdom Patterns of Animal Use and the Value of Faunal Date in Modeling Socioeconomic Systems". Paléorient. 18 (2): 99–107. doi:10.3406/paleo.1992.4575.
- Sakr, Faiza M. (2005). "New Foundation Deposits of Kom El-hisn". Studien zur Altägyptischen Kultur. 33: 349–355.
- Wenke, Robert J. (1988). "Kom El-hisn: Excavation of an Old Kingdom Settlement in the Egyptian Delta". JARCE. 25: 5–34. doi:10.2307/40000868. JSTOR 40000868.
