= Hermopolis (Lower Egypt) =

Coordinates: 30°57′00″N 31°25′00″E

Hermopolis (Greek: Ἑρμοῦ πόλις), also known as Hermopolis Mikra (City of Hermes/Thoth Small; Latin: Hermopolis Parva), was the Greek name for two cities in ancient Egypt, both in the Nile Delta, and both smaller than Hermopolis Magna to the south.

The eastern Hermopolis Parva (coordinates given) was the capital of Tehuti, the 15th nome of Lower Egypt, situated a little below Thmuis (Strabo xvii. p. 802; Steph. B. s. v.). The site is currently at Tell al-Naqus near Baqliya on a canal east of the Nile, between its Tanitic and Mendesian branches. The ancient Egyptian names of this city were Ba'h and Weprehwy or Rehehui.

The western Hermopolis Parva was the capital of the 7th nome of Lower Egypt, and is now known as Damanhur, on the canal linking Lake Mareotis (Mariout) to the Canopic branch of the Nile. The ancient Egyptian name of this city was A-ment or Iment.
