= White Chapel =

Historic site in Egypt

Coordinates: 25°43′13.20″N 32°39′25.79″E

White Chapel of Senosret I
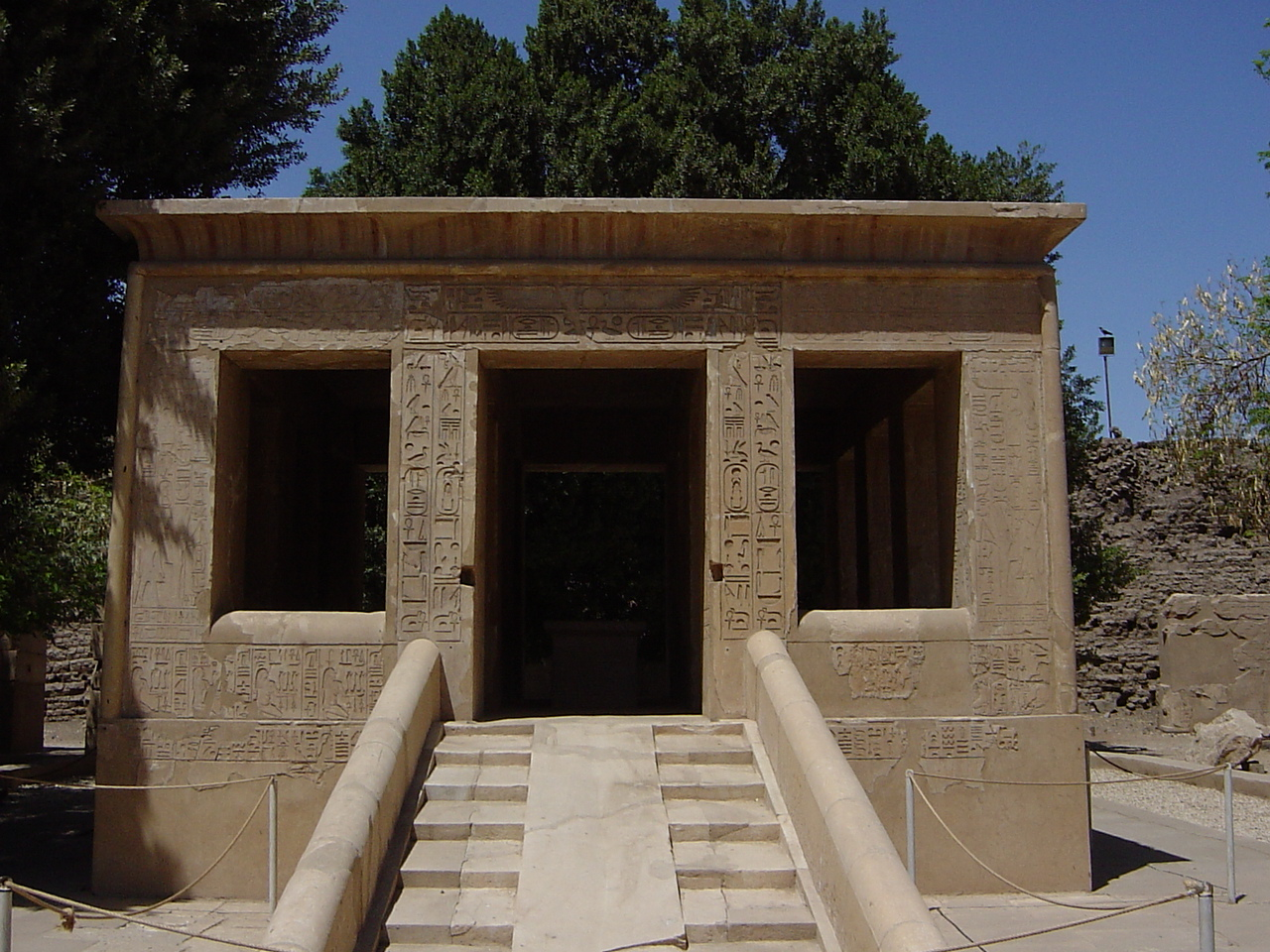
- Northern facade of the White Chapel

- Open Air Museum, Karnak Temple

History
- Built: 1971 BCE to 1926 BCE (Senusret)
- Demolished: 1390 BCE to 1352 BCE (Amenhotep III)

The White Chapel of pharaoh Senusret I, also referred to as the Jubilee Chapel of Senusret I, was built during the Middle Kingdom of Egypt. During the New Kingdom it was demolished and used as filler for the Third Pylon of the temple of Karnak, Precinct of Amun-Re.

In 1927, the dismantled pieces were found inside the Third Pylon of the main temple, constructed in the time of Amenhotep III, at Karnak, and between 1927 and 1930 all of the pieces were carefully removed. These pieces were then assembled into the building that is seen today in the Karnak Open Air Museum.

The White Chapel is made of limestone. Its columns hold reliefs of a very high quality, which are hardly seen elsewhere at Karnak, and depicts Pharaoh Senusret being crowned and embraced by Amun, Horus, Min and Ptah.

All along the base of the outer walls runs a series of reliefs depicting the emblems and deities of the nomes, or provinces, of Egypt. On the western side are the nomes of Upper Egypt, and on the eastern side are the nomes of Lower Egypt.

== Images on the White Chapel ==
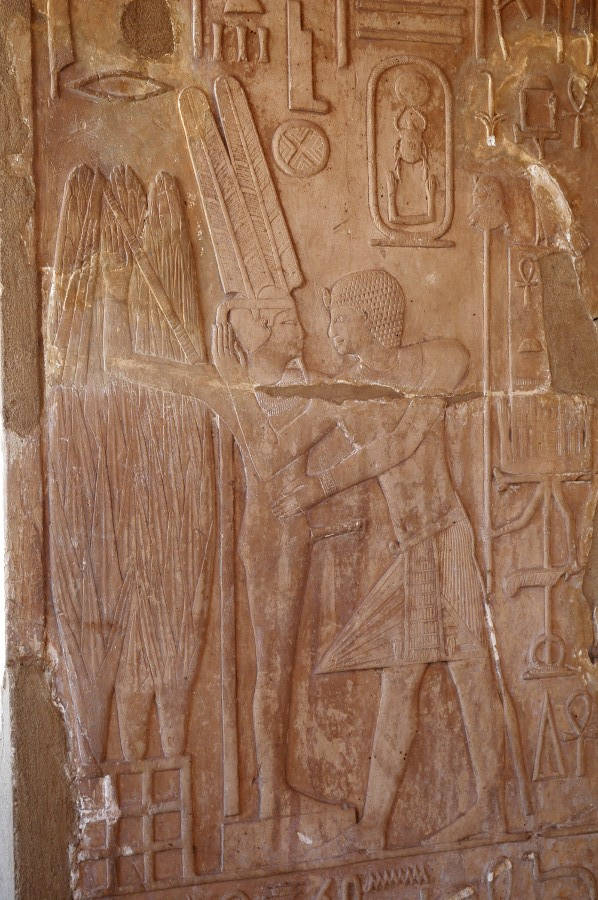
White chapel reliefs

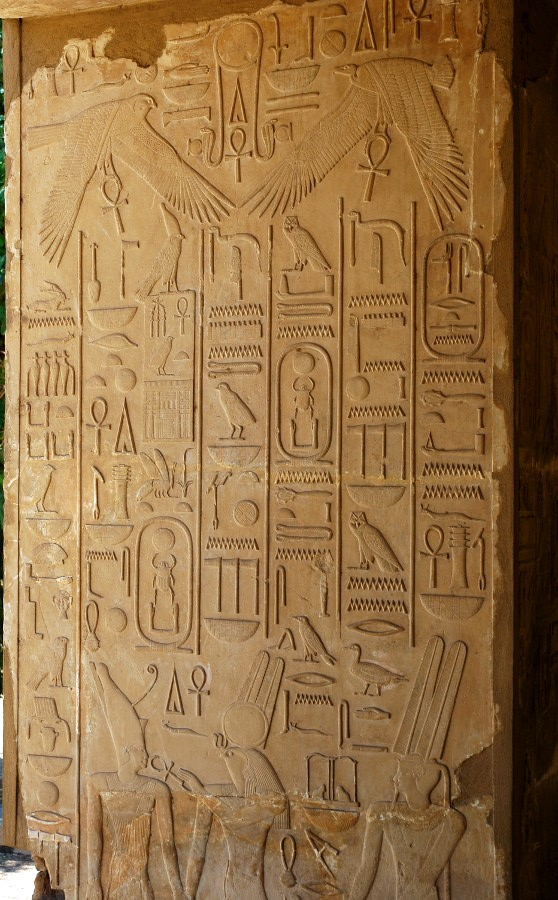
White chapel reliefs

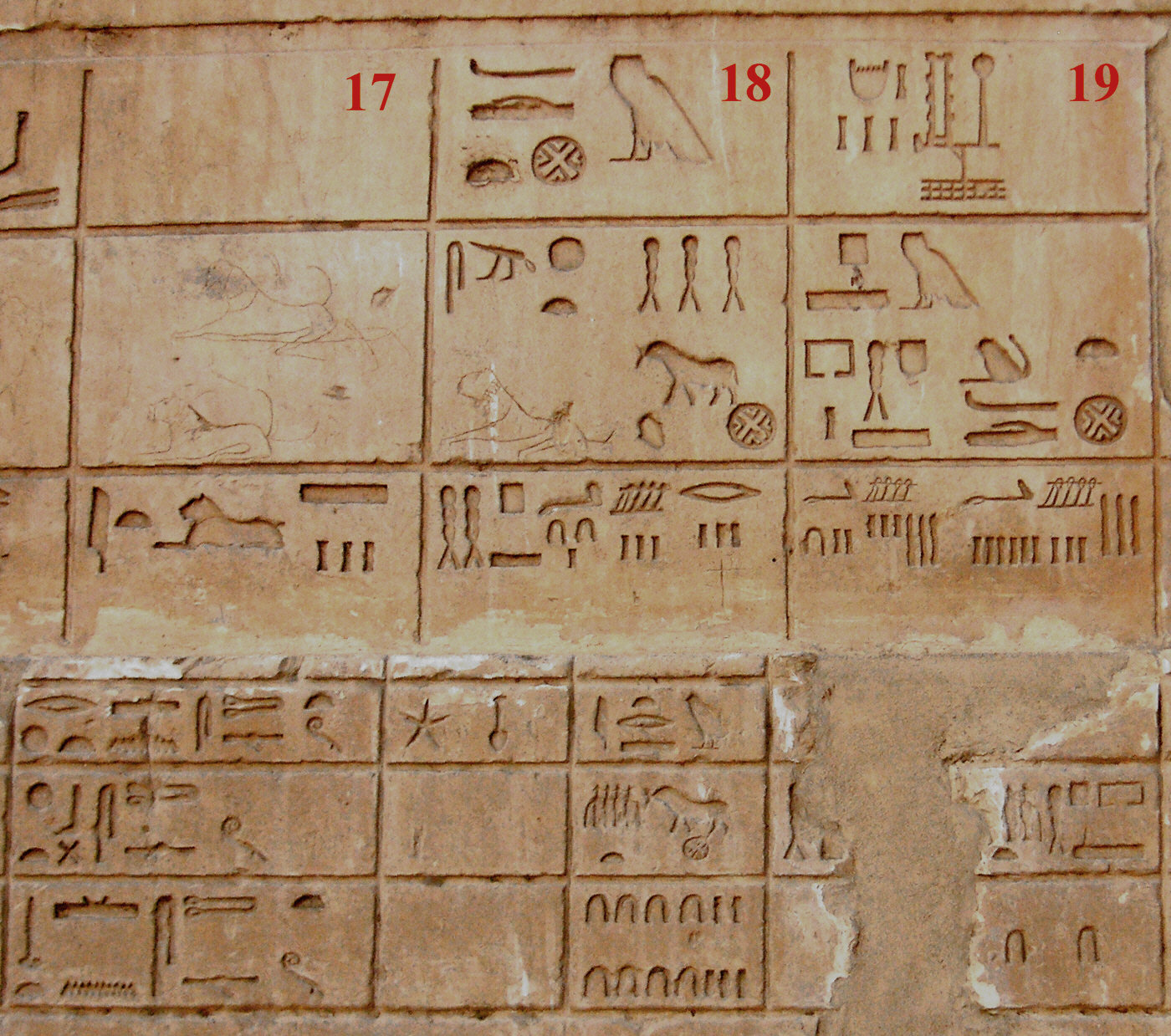
Nomes shown on the White chapel
