= Tell el-Balamun =

Tel el-Balamun ⲡⲟⲩⲛⲉⲙⲟⲩ تل البلامون
- Location within Egypt
- Coordinates: 31°15′31″N 31°34′17″E
- Country: Egypt
- Governorate: Dakahlia Governorate
- Time zone: UTC+2 (EET)
  - Summer (DST): UTC+3 (EEST)

Tell el-Balamun (Coptic: ⲡⲟⲩⲛⲉⲙⲟⲩ; Ancient Greek: Διοσπόλις ή κάτω) first known as Smabehdet, is an ancient city in Egypt dating from 2400 BC. It was once a port city on an estuary of the Nile, but is now inland of the Mediterranean Sea. In ancient times it was known as Diospolis Inferior or Diospolis Kato. It has a complex of temples.

== History ==
F36 bH d t niwt
Smꜣ bḥdt
in hieroglyphs
Era: Old Kingdom
(2686–2181 BC)

pr Z1 i mn n A40
Pr jmn
in hieroglyphs

First called Smabehdet or Behdet, the Ancient Egyptian city from 2400 BC or earlier. About 1200 BC, during the New Kingdom of Egypt, it was named Paiuenamun, meaning "The Island of the [god] Amun". It was the ancient form of the name of Balamun. Tell el-Balamun, located in an agricultural area in the Nile Delta, it was a port city of an estuary of the Nile (but is now 15 kilometres (9.3 miles) from the Mediterranean Sea due to the advance of the Nile delta).

It was the site of a complex of temples. A Ramesside temple enclosure holds temples from the 26th and 30th dynasties for Nekhtnebef, Psamtik I, and Shoshenq III. There was also a cemetery for elite citizens near the temple enclosure. There was also a tomb of Iken, a Lower Egyptian Vizier, from 900 B.C. In antiquity, the stones for the temples were removed and used for other structures or burnt for lime.

The city was continuously occupied until the 6th century A.D., when it was an ancient Roman city with a limestone slab paved road.

Tell el-Balamun in hieroglyphics is

G41 A N17 Z1 N23 n i mn n G7 kA Z1 G7 m wAs t niwt G7

Pꜣ jw n jmn kꜣ m wꜣst - The island of Amun-ka-em-Waset

== Archaeological site ==
The archaeological site, more than a kilometre in diameter, is a series of mounds up to 18 metres (59 ft). What survives within the site are a fortress, other mud structures, and trenches that show the walls of the temples. In 1913, Howard Carter performed an archaeological excavation, and his unpublished excavation records are now in the Griffith Institute, University of Oxford. Francis Ghattas of Mansura University carried out work in 1977 and 1978. The British Museum sponsored excavations beginning in 1991, in partnership with the Egypt Exploration Society, Polish Academy of Sciences and Polish Center for Mediterranean Archaeology. The project continued until 2010.

== See also ==
- List of ancient Egyptian towns and cities
- List of ancient Egyptian sites
