= Sakha, Egypt =

Xois
- Town
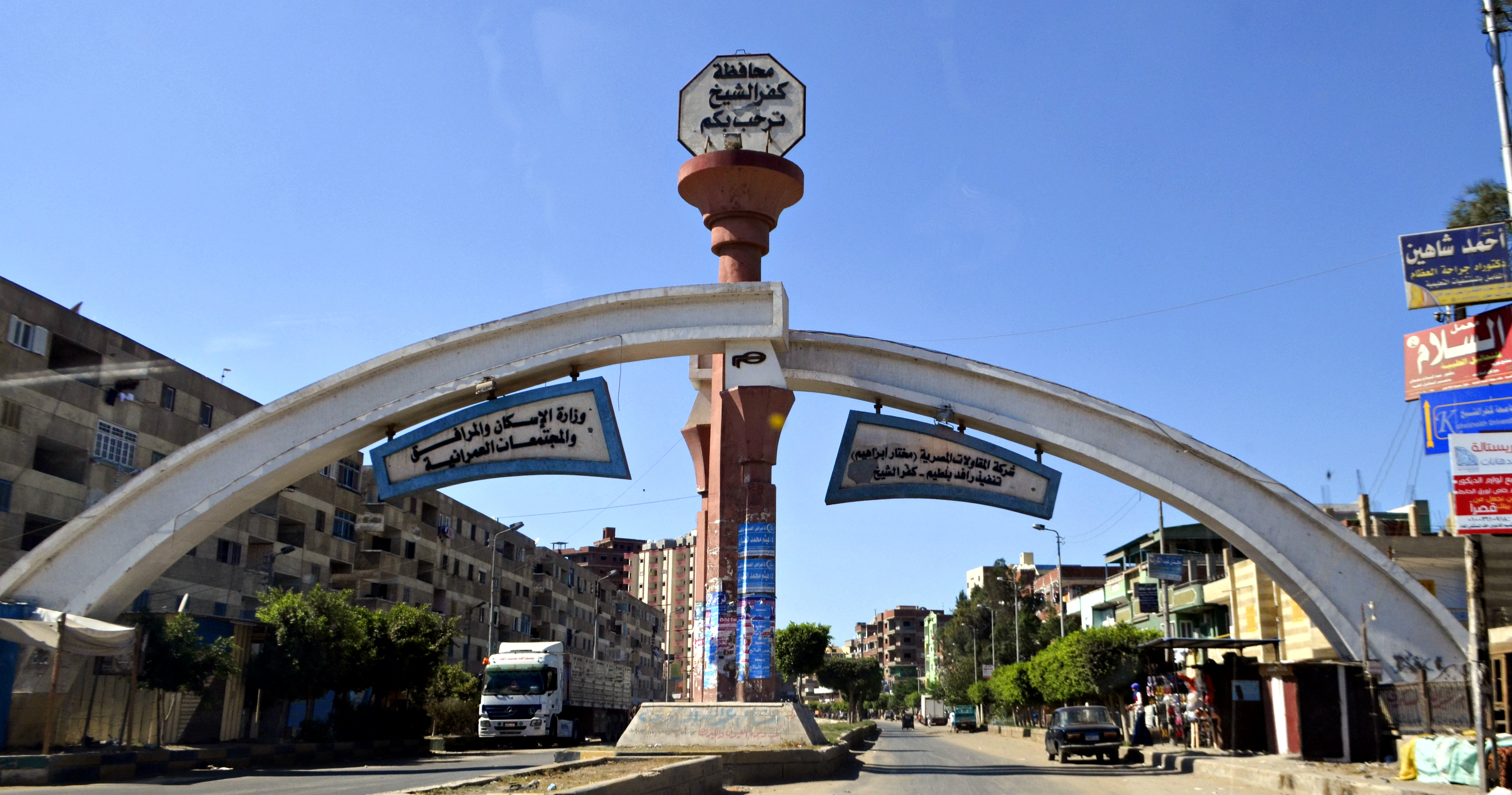
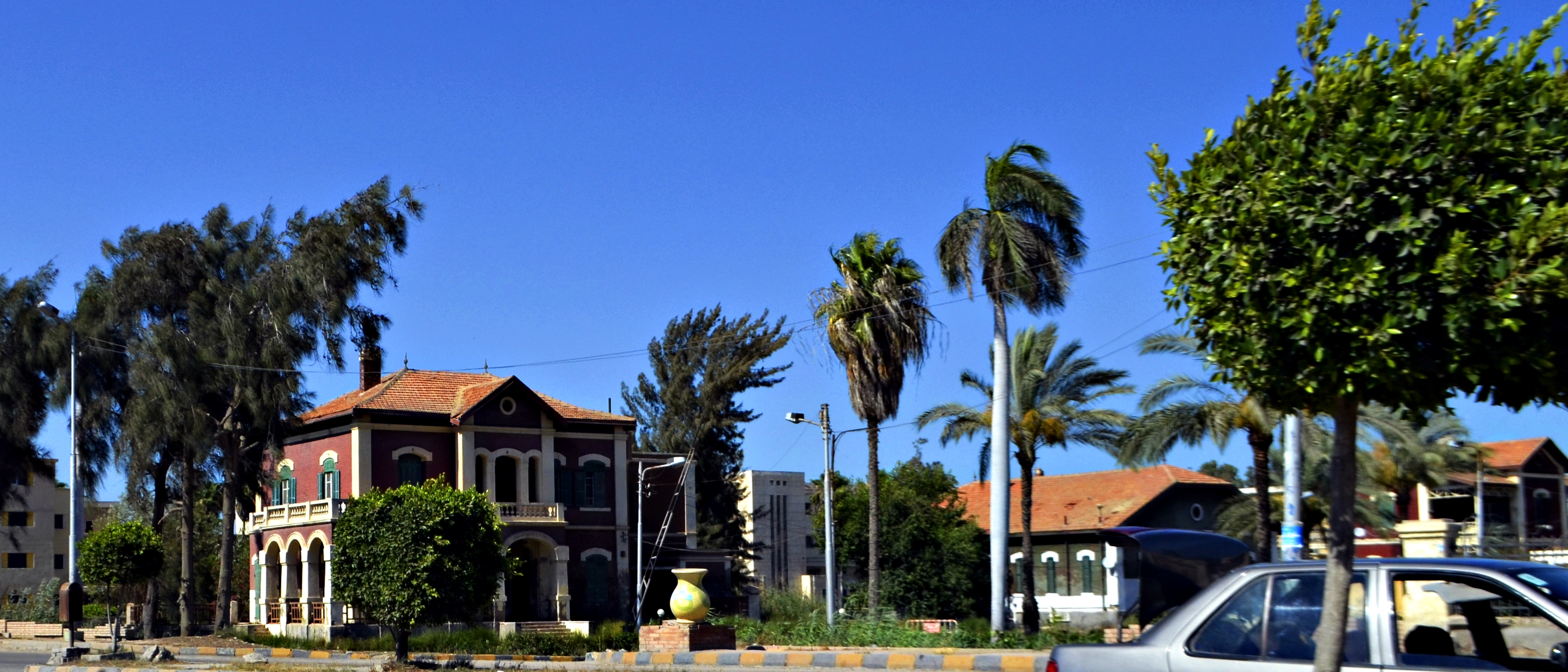
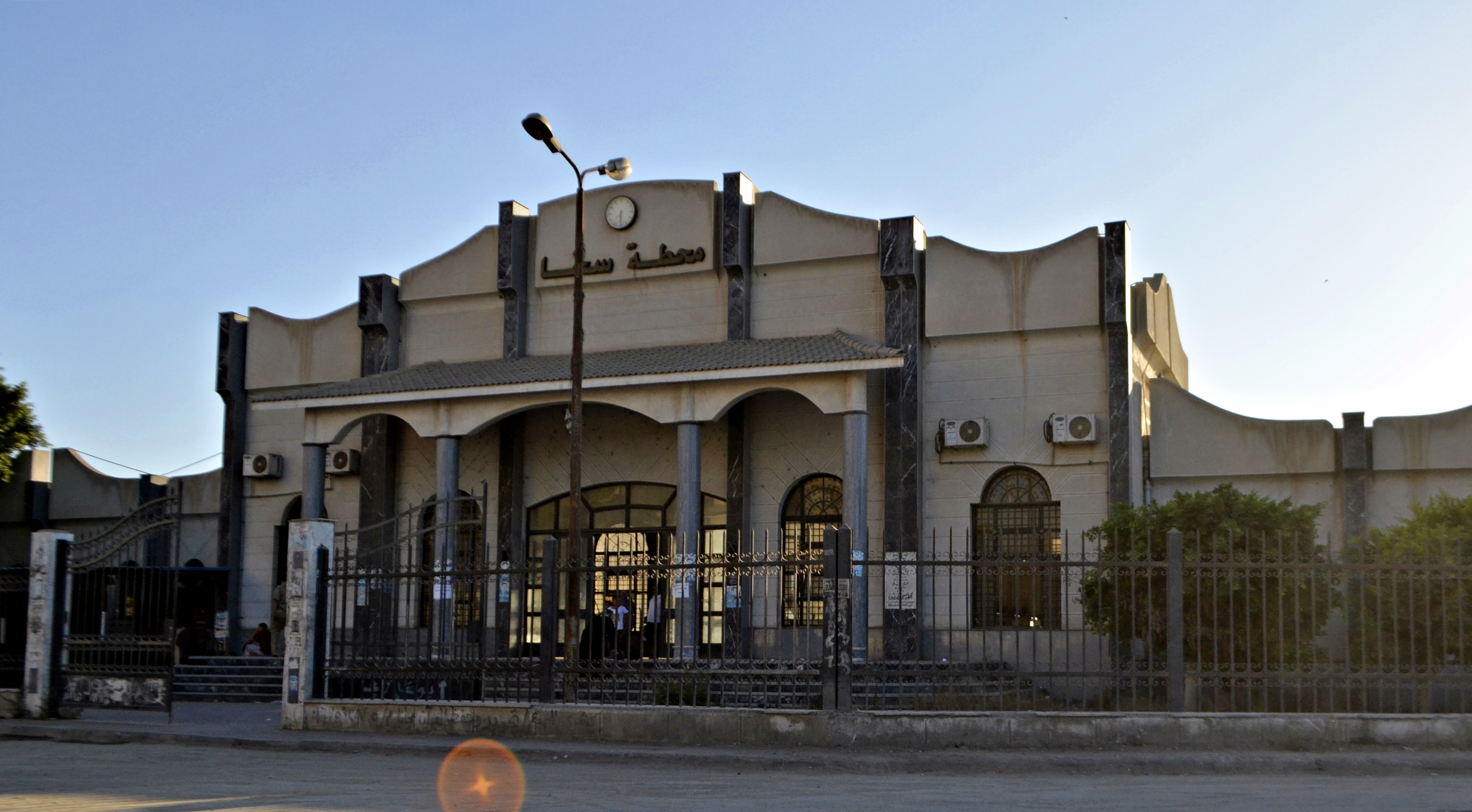
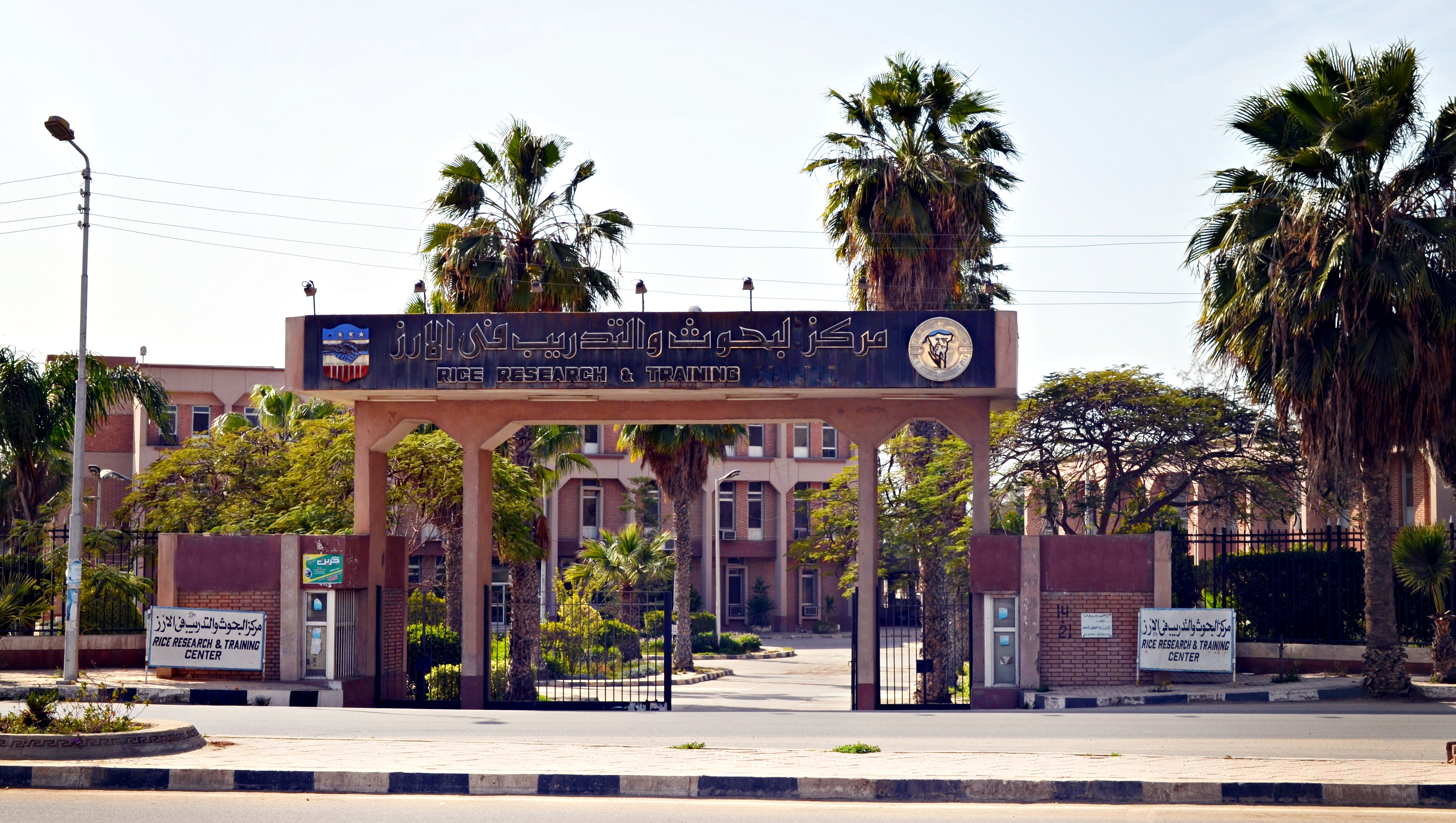

- Location in Egypt Xois (Egypt)
- Coordinates: 31.089°N 30.951°E
- Country: Egypt
- Governorate: Kafr El Sheikh

Population (2006)
  - Total: 14,733
- Time zone: UTC+2 (EET)

Sakha, also known by the ancient name of Xois (Arabic: سخا, Koine Greek: Ξόις, Coptic: ⲥϦⲱⲟⲩ Strabo xvii. p, 802; Ptolemy iv. 5. § 50; Ξόης, Stephanus of Byzantium s. v.) is a town in Kafr El Sheikh Governorate of Egypt. Located near the center of the Nile Delta, it is a city of great antiquity, identified with the ancient Egyptian city of Ḫꜣsww(t) (Khasut or Khaset).

== History ==
xA s w w t niwt
ḫꜣsww(t)
in hieroglyphs

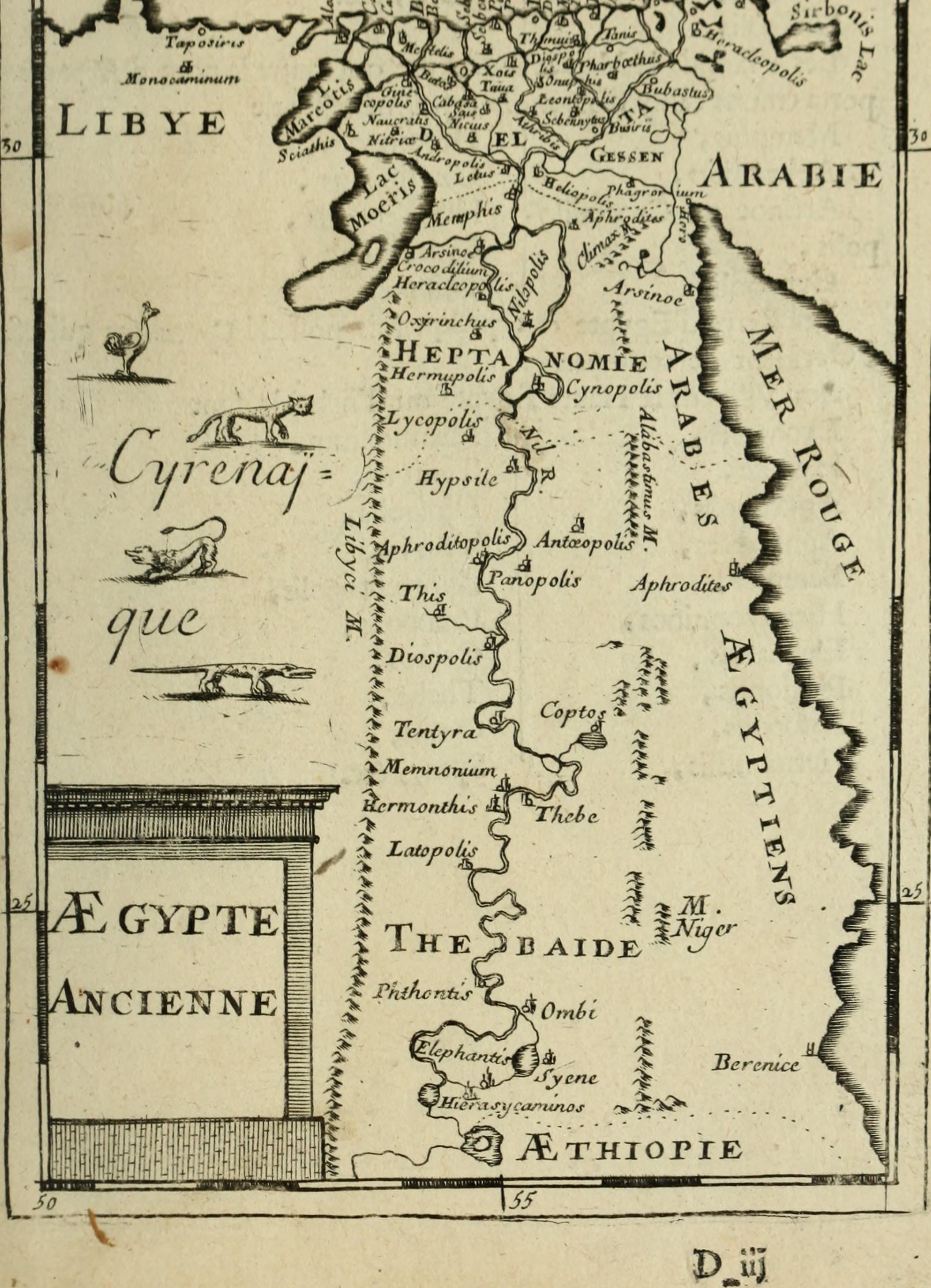
Map of ancient Egypt showing Xois

Xois sat upon an island formed by the Sebennytic and Phatnitic branches of the Nile. It belonged to the Sebennytic Nome, and later was the capital of its own nome, the Xoite nome.

The Fourteenth Dynasty of Egypt consisted, according to Manetho, of 76 Xoite kings. This dynasty immediately preceded that of the Hyksos during the Second Intermediate Period. It seems possible, therefore, that Xois, from its strong position among the marshes of the Nile Delta formed by the intersecting branches of the river, could have held out during the occupation of the Delta by the Hyksos, or at least compromised with the invaders by paying them tribute.

This hypothesis, however, is not shared by most Egyptologists today, who believe that the Fourteenth Dynasty was based in Avaris in the eastern Delta.

By some geographers, Xois is supposed to be the Papremis of Herodotus (ii. 59, iii. 12). Jean-François Champollion (l'Egypte sous les Pharaons, vol. ii. p. 214) identified Xois's remains at modern-day Sakha (Sakkra), which is the Arabic version of the Coptic Sḫeow and Egyptian sḫw (Niebuhr, Travels, vol. i. p. 75). The road from Tamiathis to Memphis passed through Xois.

Through the Roman and Byzantine era, Xois was the center of a Christian diocese. It remains a vacant titular bishopric. The diocese remained active through at least the year 700.

In the 900s, Ibn Hawqal described Sakha as a large city. At the time of Yaqut al-Hamawi in the 1200s, Sakha was the capital of the province of Gharbia. By the time of Ibn Duqmaq, it was no longer the provincial capital, but it remained a large city that lent its name to a major sub-district of the province.

The 1885 Census of Egypt recorded Sakha as a nahiyah under the district of Kafr El Sheikh in Gharbia Governorate; at that time, the population of the town was 950 (480 men and 470 women).

Christian tradition holds that Sakha was one of the places that the family of Jesus visited during their Flight into Egypt. In 1984, a stone said to bear the footprint of Jesus was found, which had been buried in medieval times. The stone was authorized by Coptic Pope Shenouda III and several miracles have been attributed to it.

== See also ==
- List of ancient Egyptian towns and cities
