= Abusir Bana =

Village in Gharbia Governorate, Egypt

Abusir Bana أبو صير بنا
- Village
- Location in Egypt
- Coordinates: 30°54′46″N 31°14′34″E
- Country: Egypt
- Governorate: Gharbia

Population (2006)
  - Total: 22,214
- Time zone: UTC+2 (EET)
  - Summer (DST): UTC+3 (EEST)

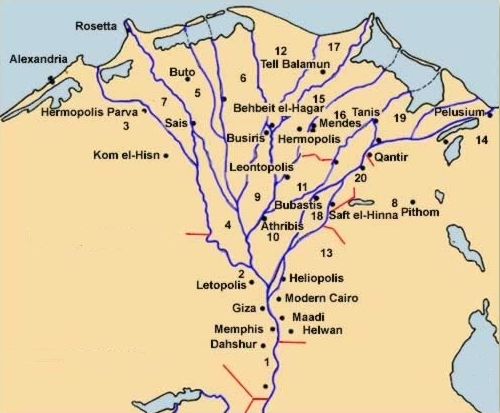
Busiris is shown in the central delta, among the ancient settlements of Lower Egypt

Abusir Bana (Egyptian Arabic: أبو صير بنا), known in ancient times as Busiris (Greek: Βούσιρις; Coptic: ⲡⲟⲩⲥⲓⲣⲓ, ⲃⲟⲩⲥⲓⲣⲓ, romanized: pusiri, busiri, lit. 'house of Osiris'), is a village in Gharbia, Egypt. The population is 22,214 people, according to the official census of 2006.

In antiquity, Busiris was the chief town of the Ati nome in Egypt. It stood east of Sais, near the Phatnitic mouth on the western bank of the Damietta Branch of the Nile. The city's pharaonic name was Djedu. The modern name is a compound that combines the original name with the name of the nearby town of Bana (Egyptian Arabic: بنا, Coptic: ⲡⲁⲛⲁⲩ, lit. 'one of the donkey, ass') was added to differentiate it from other settlements of the same name spread around Egypt.

== History ==
The town and nome of Busiris were allotted to the Hermotybian division of the Egyptian militia. It was regarded as one of the birthplaces of the god of the underworld Osiris, who was commonly given the epithet lord of Djedu (nb ḏdw) and its name may be etymologically linked. The festival of Isis at Busiris came next in splendor and importance to that of Bastet at Bubastis in the Egyptian calendar. Considerable ruins are still extant.

The temple of Isis, indeed, with the hamlet which sprang up around it, stood probably at a short distance without the walls of Busiris itself, for Pliny (v. 10. s. 11) mentions Isidis oppidum in the neighbourhood of the town. The ruins of the temple are still visible, a little to the north of Abusir, at the hamlet of Bahheyt. (Pococke, Travels, vol. i. p. 34; Minutoli, p. 304.) During the Roman era, the town was located in the Roman province of Aegyptus secundus.

Abusir Bana in hieroglyphs
R11 R11 G43 O49
Djedu
ḏdw

After the Arab conquest of Egypt, the city was known as Busir Samannud (Arabic: بوصير سمنود) and it was the seat of a bishopric. The local Copts believed that it was named after one of the sorcerers of Pharaoh, whose name was Busir.

== Ecclesiastical history ==
Later, Busiris became a Christian bishopric. Extant documents provide the name of two of its early bishops: Hermaeon and Athanasius, the latter of whom took part in the Second Council of Ephesus in 449. In later centuries, from the 8th onward, the name of several of its non-Chalcedonian bishops are also known.

== Titular see ==
No longer a residential bishopric, Busiris is today listed by the Catholic Church as a titular see of the lowest (episcopal) rank.

The nominally revived diocese had the following near-consecutive incumbents:

- Alexander Chulaparambil (1914.07.16 – 1923.12.21)
- Celestino Annibale Cattaneo, Capuchin friars (O.F.M. Cap.) (later Archbishop) (1925.03.30 – 1936.03.03)
- Ignazio Arnoz, Mill Hill Missionaries (M.H.M.) (1937.04.13 – 1950.02.26)
- Johannes Albert von Rudloff (1950.04.08 – 1978.06.26)
- Theodor Kettmann, Auxiliary Bishop emeritus of Osnabrück (1978.11.27 – ... )

== See also ==
- List of ancient Egyptian towns and cities
