= Tell Nebesha =

Archaeological site in Egypt

Coordinates: 30°51′36″N 31°54′38″E

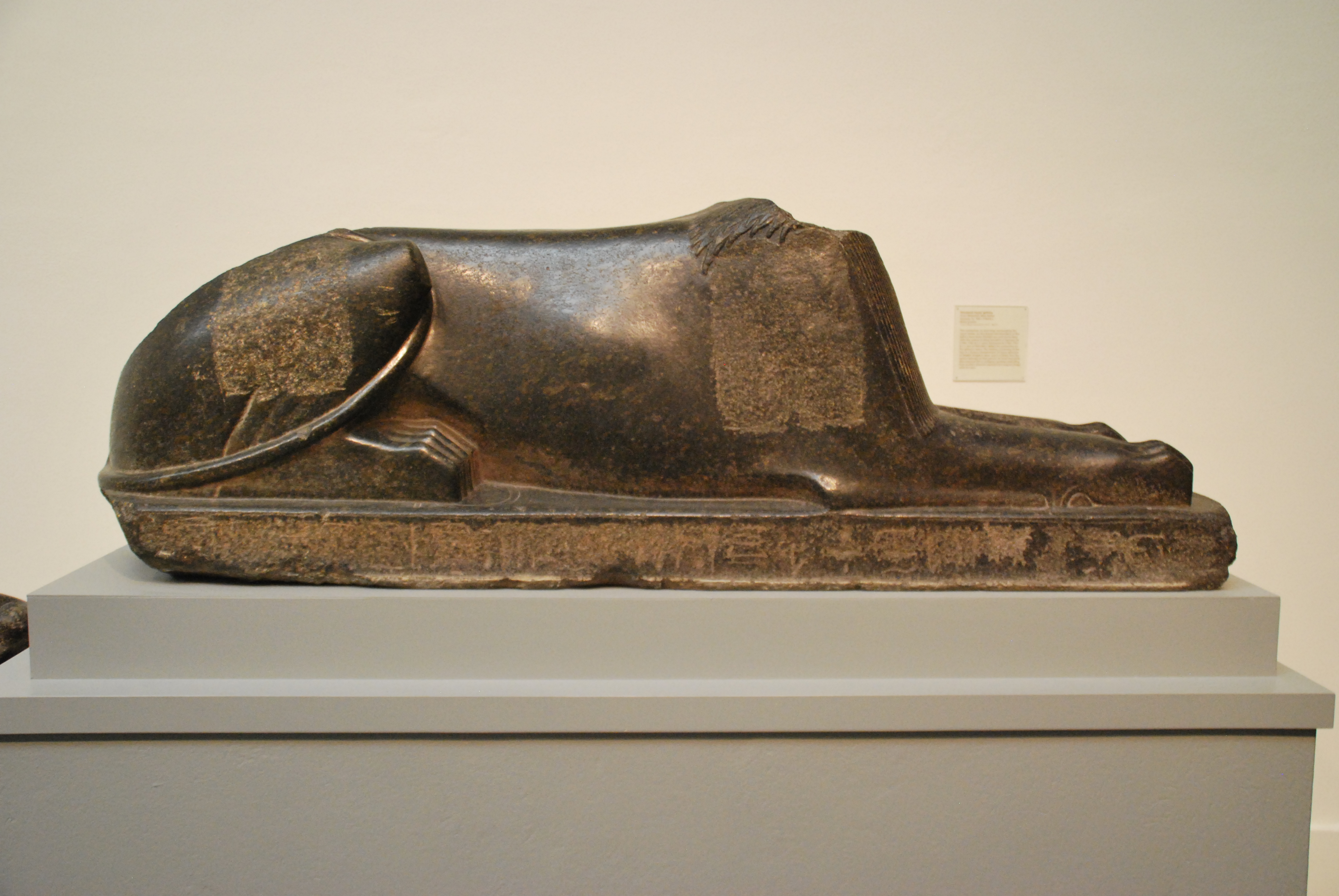
Royal sphinx from Nebesheh; black granite; 12th Dynasty. Boston Museum of Fine Arts

i m y i i Q7 t niwt
ꜣ(j)mjjt
in hieroglyphs
Era: New Kingdom
(1550–1069 BC)

i Aa15 m t Xrd niwt
ꜣ(j)mm(t)
in hieroglyphs

Tell Nebesha or Nebesheh (also known as 'Faraon' or 'Farun') is an archaeological site in Egypt, and the location of the ancient city of Imet. It is found around 10km south of Tanis in the Eastern Nile Delta. This was the ancient capital of the 19th Nome of Lower Egypt. By the Assyrian period, it was succeeded by Tanis.

== Excavations by Petrie ==
In 1886, while working for the Egypt Exploration Fund, Flinders Petrie first excavated there. Among the remains of an ancient temple, Petrie found a royal sphinx, now located at the Museum of Fine Arts, Boston. The sculpture is now believed to date to the time of Amenemhat III (12th Dynasty) or later.

Petrie concluded that the temple was built during the 12th Dynasty, and then reused in the 19th Dynasty under Ramesses II.

In the course of Petrie's excavations,

"In one of the earlier tombs no fewer than two hundred uninscribed funerary statuettes in green-glazed pottery were found; and in another some thirty thousand beads of glass, silver, and lapis lazuli. Bronze spear-heads, amulets, scarabs, etc., were also turned up in considerable numbers."

Petrie also found the remains of a colossal seated statue of Rameses II, a Middle Kingdom granite altar, and remains of two Middle Kingdom statue-thrones carved from red sandstone.

The Egyptian Supreme Council of Antiquities also excavated there later on. Middle Kingdom and later burials were identified. Some Saite tombs were found in the 1985/6 season.

== Description ==
The site consists of three areas: the temple site, the town, and the cemetery.

A temple at the site, dedicated to the goddess Wadjet, the cobra goddess of Lower Egypt, may have been constructed during the Ramesside Period. Yet the evidence of inscriptions discovered at the site "clearly indicates that occupation begun in the 18th Dynasty".

Wadjet was worshipped in the area as the 'Lady of Imet'. Later she was joined by Min and Horus to form a triad of deities. This was based on an Osiriac model identified elsewhere in Egypt.

The enclosure contained two temples. A smaller one has been dated by foundation deposits naming King Ahmose II (Amasis) of 26th Dynasty. It seems to have been dedicated to the deity Min. The bigger temple was dedicated to Wadjet.

Re-used monuments from the Middle Kingdom were also found. They may have been moved here from another location.

== Excavations in 2025 ==
In June 2025, British archaeologists unearthed the remains of the ancient city of Imet, a discovery announced by the Egyptian Ministry of Tourism and Antiquities. The excavation revealed remains of residential buildings, granaries, artifacts including a faience ushabti, a bronze sistrum with Hathor's head, and a Horus stela and animal shelters dating to the early or mid-4th century BCE. Imet, historically one of the residential centers in Lower Egypt during the New Kingdom and Late Period, was distinguished by a substantial temple dedicated to the goddess Wadjet. Evidence suggests this temple was reused during the reigns of King Ramses II and King Amasis II, attracting pilgrims and merchants, which accounts for the numerous associated houses and storage structures found.

In April 2026, an Egyptian archaeological mission from the Supreme Council of Antiquities discovered a massive limestone statue which experts have identified as likely depicting Pharaoh Ramesses II. Standing approximately 2.2 meters tall and weighing between 5 and 6 tons, the statue is missing its lower section, including the base and legs. Archaeologists believe the statue was moved in antiquity from the ancient capital, Pi-Ramesses, to Tell el-Faraon to be repurposed within a religious complex. The artifact has been transferred to a museum storage facility in San El-Hagar, where it will undergo restoration in accordance with established conservation standards.

== See also ==
- List of ancient Egyptian sites

== See also ==
- Tahpanhes

== Bibliography ==
- Bakry, H.S.K., “Recent Discoveries in the Delta. A Statue of Ramesses IV (1151- 1145 BC) found at Tell el-Farûn”, RSO 46, 1971, 8-11.
- Bonnet, C., RÄRG, 130.
- Bresciani, E., “Tre documenti dall' Egitto. III. Stele funeraria demotica da Husseneiah”, SCO 17, 1968, 234-236.
- Brink, E. van den, MDAIK 43 (1986), 7ff;
- De Cenival, J.L., “Les textes de la statue E 25.550 du Musée du Louvre”, RdE 17, 1965, 15-20.
- Daressy, G., “Le roi Auput et son domaine”, RT 30, 1908, 202-208.
- ----, “Léontopolis, métropole du XlXe nome de la Basse-égypte”, BIFAO 30, 1931, 624-649.
- Drioton, E., “Les fêtes de Bouto”, BIE 25, 1943, 1-19.
- Foucart, G., “Extraits des rapports adressés pendant une inspection de la Basse-égypte en 1893-1894”, ASAE 2, 1901, 44-83, especially 67-69.
- Gardiner, Ancient Egyptian Onomastica, II, 170*-171*, no. 409.
- Gauthier, Dictionnaire Géographique, I, 73-74.
- Jacquet-Gordon, H., “A Donation Stela of Apries”, RdE 24, 1972, 84-90.
- Kamal, A., “Tell Faraon (Bouto)”, ASAE 3, 1902, 7-14.
- I M Kamal: ASAE 65, 83-9;
- Leclant, Or. 34, 1965, 180, §7; Or. 35, 1966, 134, §13; Or. 40, 1971, 228-229, §8; Or. 41, 1972, 251, §6; Or 42 (1973), 396; Or. 43, 1974, 175, §13; Or. 52, 1983, 411-472, §16; Or. 54, 1985, 347-348, §22;
- Leclant and Clerc, Or. 55, 1986, 246, §21.
- Martin, K., “Imet”, LÄ III, 140-141.
- Montet, P., Géographie, I, 180-182.
- Mustafa, I.A., “A Preliminary Report on the Excavation of the EAO at Tell Faraon - 'Imet', Season 1985- 1986”, in van den Brink (ed.), The Archaeology of the Niie Delta, 141-149.
- ----, “Some Objects Dating from the Archaic Period Period at Tell Faraon-Imet”, GM 102, 1988, 73-84.
- ----. “Tell Faraon-Imet”, Bull. GIECE 11, 1986, 8-12.
- ----, “Tell Faraon-Imet”, Bull. GIECE 13, 1988, 14-18, 19-22.
- Petrie, W.M.F., Tanis II, Nebesheh (Am) and Defenneh (Tahpanhes), London, 1888, 1-37.
- ----, Ten Years' Digging in Egypt. London, 1893, 64-70.
- Vincent Razanajao, « La demeure de Min maître d’Imet. Un monument de Tell Farâoun réinterprété », ENIM 2, 2009, p. 103-108.
- Vincent Razanajao, "Tell el-Fara'un and the Ancient Imet", in: M.I. Bakr and H. Brandl with F. Kalloniatis (eds.), Egyptian Antiquities from the Eastern Nile Delta (Museums in the Nile Delta, vol. 2), Cairo/Berlin 2014, pp. 48-58, 200-239; ISBN 9783000453182.
