= Andjety =

Ancient Egyptian deity

Name in hieroglyphs
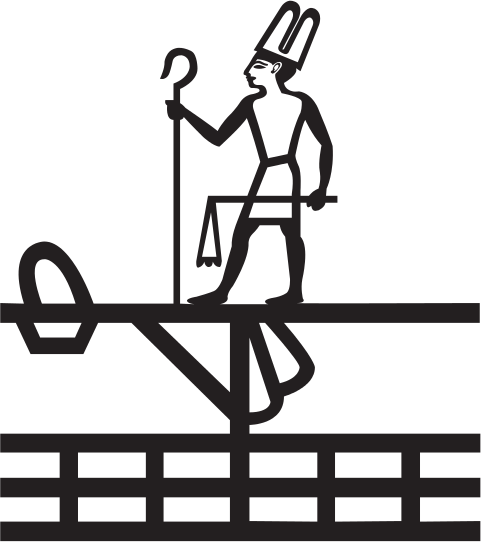
a n D&t ti i or a n D t y N24 A40 or
- Major cult center: Andjet
- Consort: Anit

Andjety (meaning "He of Andjet") is a local ancient Egyptian deity of the ninth nome, centered at Andjet, which was known as Busiris to the Greeks. This deity is also known by the alternative names Anezti or Anedjti. Andjety is considered one of the earliest Egyptian gods, possibly with roots in prehistoric Egypt.

Andjety is thought to have been a precursor of Osiris. Like Osiris, he is depicted holding the crook and flail and has a crown similar to Osiris's Atef crown. Pharaoh Sneferu of the Fourth Dynasty, builder of the first true pyramid, is shown wearing the crown of Andjety. In the Pyramid Texts the deceased pharaoh is identified with Andjety. In the temple of Seti I, the pharaoh is shown offering incense to Osiris-Andjety who is accompanied by Isis.

He also is shown to have fertility aspects, being known by the epithet "bull of vultures". His name is sometimes written with a substitution of a stylized uterus for the feather in the hieroglyphs.

== Writings mentioning Andjety ==
- Coffin Text V-385 – “I immerse the waterways as Osiris, Lord of corruption, as Adjety, bull of vultures.”
- Coffin Text I-255 – “O Horus Lord of Life, far downstream and upstream from Andjety, make inspection of those who are in Djedu, come and go in Rosetau, clear the vision of those who are in the underworld. Farther upstream from Rosetau to Abydos, the primeval place of the Lord of All."
- Coffin Text IV-331 – “O Thoth vindicate Osiris against his foes in:--- the great tribunal which is in the two banks of the kite on the night of the drowning of the great god in Andjety."
- Pyramid texts 182 – “In your name the one who is in Andjet headman of his nomes"
- Pyramid texts 220 – “May your staff be the head of the spirits, as Anubis who presides over the Westerners, and Andjety who presides over the eastern nomes"
- Pyramid texts 614 – “Horus has revived you in this your name of Andjety"
