= Nome (Egypt) =

Subnational administrative division of ancient Egypt

A nome (/noʊm/; from Ancient Greek: νομός, nomós, "district") was a territorial division in ancient Egypt.

Each nome was ruled by a nomarch (Ancient Egyptian: ḥrj tp ꜥꜣ, "Great Chief"). The number of nomes changed through the various periods of the history of ancient Egypt.

== Etymology ==
The term nome comes from Ancient Greek νομός nomós meaning "pasture" extended to "dwelling" and "district"; the Ancient Egyptian term was spꜣt (modern pronunciation /sɛpɑt/). Today's use of the Ancient Greek rather than the Ancient Egyptian term came about during the Ptolemaic period, when the use of Greek was widespread in Egypt. The availability of Greek records on Egypt influenced the adoption of Greek terms by later historians.

== History ==
=== Dynastic Egypt ===
The nomes & towns of Egypt in hieroglyphics

The division of ancient Egypt into nomes can be traced back to the Early Dynastic period, before the Third Dynasty. One of the earliest direct attestations of the name of an Egyptian nome is an ink inscription on a jar found in the galleries beneath Djoser's pyramid and which may date to the reign of the Second Dynasty king Nynetjer. Another attestation dates to the slightly later reign of Seth-Peribsen. The nome system may have originated earlier still, being coeval with the unification of Egypt as such a regional administration would have been essential for the cohesion of the recently unified lands. Alternatively, Egyptologists have held the view that the system emerged from the economic demands due to pyramid-building. This view however is weakened by the observations that the early attestations pre-date the first pyramid, and that other very large building projects had already taken place prior to Djoser's reign, notably the enclosures of Khasekhemwy at Hierakonpolis and Abydos.

Not only did the division into nomes remain in place for more than three millennia, the areas of the individual nomes and their ordering remained remarkably stable. Some, like Xois in the Nile Delta or Khent in Upper Egypt, were first mentioned on the Palermo Stone, which was inscribed in the Fifth Dynasty. The names of a few, like the nome of Bubastis, appeared no earlier than the New Kingdom. Under the system that prevailed for most of pharaonic Egypt's history, the country was divided into 42 nomes.

==== Lower Egypt nomes ====
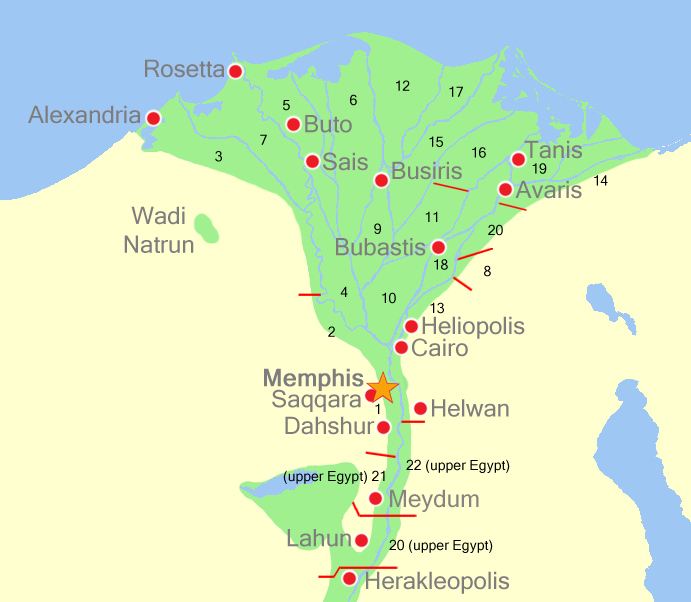
Lower Egypt nomes

Lower Egypt (Egyptian: "Ā-meḥty"), from the Old Kingdom capital Memphis to the Mediterranean Sea, comprised 20 nomes. The first was based around Memphis, Saqqara, and Giza, in the area occupied by modern-day Cairo. The nomes were numbered in a more or less orderly fashion south to north through the Nile Delta, first covering the territory on the west before continuing with the higher numbers to the east. Thus, Alexandria was in the Third Nome; Bubastis was in the Eighteenth.

==== Upper Egypt nomes ====
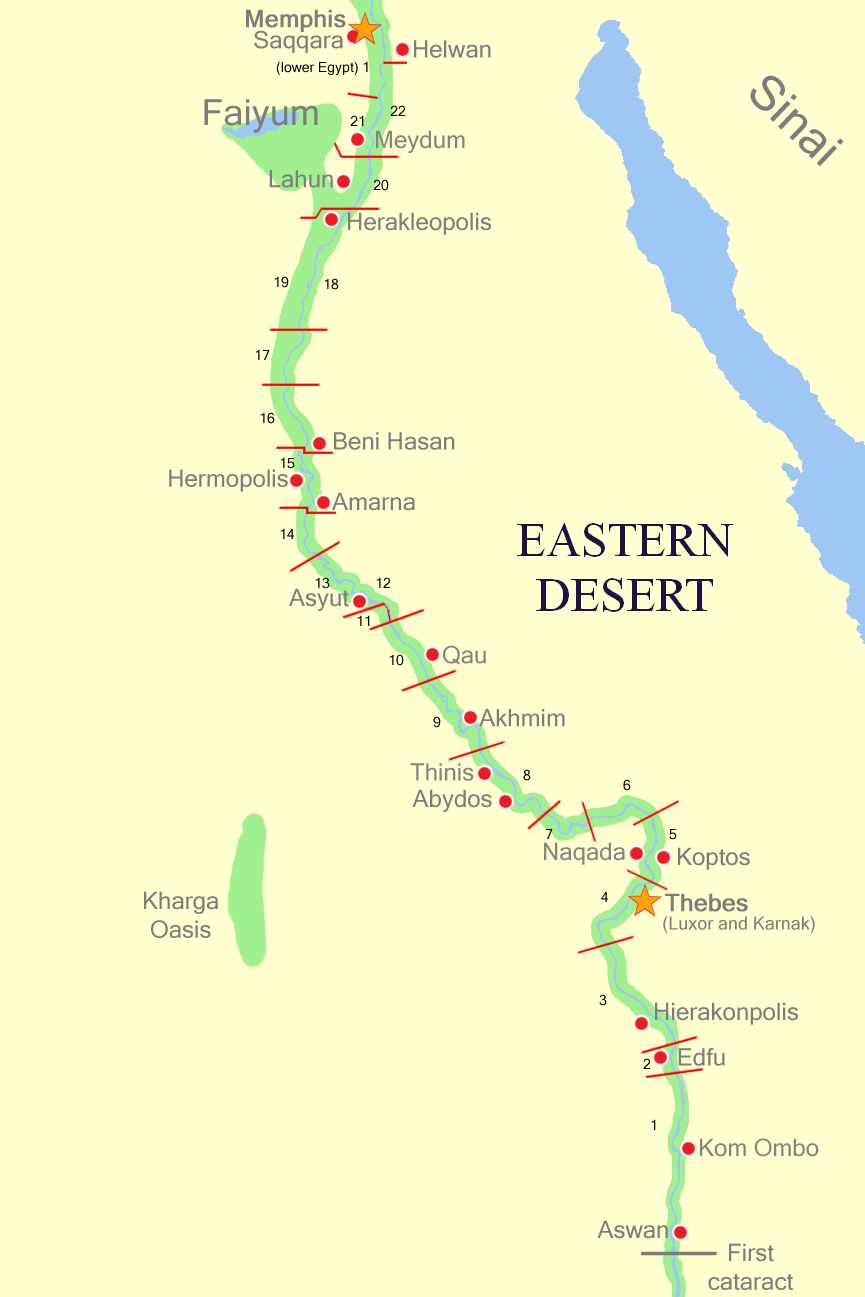
Upper Egypt nomes

Upper Egypt was divided into 22 nomes. The first of these was centered on Elephantine close to Egypt's border with Nubia at the First Cataract – the area of modern-day Aswan. From there the numbering progressed downriver in an orderly fashion along the narrow fertile strip of land that was the Nile valley. Waset (ancient Thebes or contemporary Luxor) was in the Fourth Nome, Amarna in the Fourteenth, and Meidum in the Twenty-first.

=== Ptolemaic Egypt ===
Some nomes were added or renamed during the Graeco-Roman era of Egypt. For example, the Ptolemies renamed the Crocodilopolitan nome to Arsinoe.

==== Roman Egypt ====
The nomes survived into Roman times. Under Roman rule, individual nomes minted their own coinage, the so-called "nome coins", which still reflect individual local associations and traditions. The nomes of Egypt retained their primary importance as administrative units until the fundamental rearrangement of the bureaucracy during the reigns of Diocletian and Constantine the Great. Additionally, Hadrian created a new nome, Antinoopolites, for which Antinoöpolis was the capital.

From AD 307/8, their place was taken by smaller units called pagi. Eventually powerful local officials arose who were called pagarchs, through whom all patronage flowed. The pagarch's essential role was as an organizer of tax-collection. Later the pagarch assumed some military functions as well. The pagarchs were often wealthy landowners who reigned over the pagi from which they originated.

== Nomarch ==
For most of the history, each nome was headed by a nomarch. The position of the nomarch was at times hereditary, while at others they were appointed by the pharaoh. Generally, when the national government was stronger, nomarchs were the king's appointed governors. When the central government was weaker, however—such as during foreign invasions or civil wars—individual nomes would assert themselves and establish hereditary lines of succession. Conflicts among these different hereditary nomarchies were common, most notably during the First Intermediate Period, a time that saw a breakdown in central authority lasting from the 7th–11th Dynasties which ended when one of the local rulers became strong enough to again assert control over the entire country as pharaoh.

== List of nomes ==
The nomes (Ancient Egyptian: spꜣt sepat, Coptic: ⲡⲑⲱϣ) are listed in separate tables for "Isti" - "the two Egypts" (Upper and Lower Egypt).

Note:

1. older or other variants of the name in square brackets '[ ]';
2. names vary from different time or era, or even titles, most epithets, honorific titles with a slash '/';
3. Greek-Egypto derived names from the original Egyptian in parentheses '()'

=== Lower Egypt ===
Number	Nome Standard (Symbol on top of head of man or woman)		Ancient Egyptian Nome Name		Ancient Greek and Coptic Nome Name		Capital	Modern name of capital site	God
Number	Image	Unicode	Transliteration	Translation	Greek	Coptic	Capital	Modern name of capital site	God
1		𓈠	jnb-ḥḏ Inebu-hedj	White Walls	Μεμφίτης Memphites	ⲙⲛⲫⲉ/ ⲉⲕⲉⲡϯⲁ	jnb-ḥḏ Ineb-Ḥedj ( 𓏠𓈖𓄤𓆑𓂋𓉴𓊖 mn-nfr Mennefer) (Memphis)	Mit Rahina	Ptah
2	Khensu	𓈡	ḫpš Khepesh	Cow's thigh	Λητοπολίτης Letopolites	ⲃⲟⲩϣⲏⲙ	𓐍𓋉𓅓𓊖 ḫm Khem [Sekhem/ Iry] (Letopolis)	Ausim	Horus
3	Iment (Ament)	𓈢	jmntt Imentet/Amentet	West	Γυναικοπολίτης Gynaikopolites		I-am/ Imu (Apis)	Kom El Hisn	Hathor
4	Sapi-Res	𓈣	nt-rsj/nt-rsw Nit Resy/Nit Resu	Southern Neith	Προσωπίτης Prosopites	ⲡϣⲁϯ	Niciu	Zawyet el-Razin	
4 (21)	Sapi-Res	𓈣	nt-rsj/rsw Nit Resy/Resu	Southern Neith	Φθεμφουθ Phthemphouth		Ptkheka	Tanta	Sobek, Isis, Amun
5	Sap-Meh Sap-Meh Sap-Meh	𓈤/𓈥	nt-mḥtt Nit Meḥtet	Northern Neith	Σαίτης Saites	ⲥⲁⲓ	𓊃𓅭𓄿𓅱𓊖 zꜣw Sau/ Zau (Sais)	Sa El Hagar	Neith
6	Khaset	𓈦	ḫꜣsww Khasuu	Mountain bull	Ξοίτης Xoites	ⲥϧⲱⲟⲩ	𓆼𓋴𓅱𓅱𓏏𓊖 ḫꜣsww Khasu (Xois)	Sakha	Amun-Ra
7	A-ment	𓈧	ḥww-(gs)-jmnty Huu-(ges)-Imenti	West harpoon	Μενελαίτης Menelaites		𓂧𓏇𓇌𓊖𓏌𓅃𓏤 (Hermopolis Parva, Metelis)	Damanhur	Hu
8	Nefer-Iabti	𓈨	ḥww-(gs)-jꜣbty Huu-(ges)-Iabty	East harpoon	Ἡροοπολίτης Heroopolites		Thek/ Tjeku / Iset-Tem 𓉐𓏤𓏏𓍃𓅓𓏏𓊖 pr-jtmw Per-Atum/ Ān (Heroonpolis, Pithom)	Tell al-Maskhuta	Atum
9	Ati	𓈩	ꜥnḏty Andjety	Andjety	Βουσιρίτης Bousirites	ⲡⲁⲛⲁⲩ	𓉐𓏤𓊨𓁹𓎟𓊽𓂧𓅱𓊖 ḏdw Djedu (Busiris)	Abu Sir Bara	Osiris
10	Ka-Khem	𓈪	km-wr/kꜣ-km Kem-Wer/Ka-kem	Black bull	Ἀθριβίτης Athribites	ⲁⲑⲣⲏⲃⲓ	𓉗𓏏𓉐𓇾𓁷𓄣𓊖 Hut-hery-ib (Athribis)	Banha (Tell Atrib)	Horus
11	Ka-Heseb	𓈫	(kꜣ)-ḥsb (Ka)-Heseb	Heseb bull	Λεοντοπολίτης Leontopolites	ⲛⲁⲑⲱ	Taremu/ Ikhenu (Leontopolis)	Tell el-Muqdam	Isis
12	Tjeb-Ka	𓈬	ṯb-kꜣ/ṯb-nṯr Tjeb-Ka/Tjeb-Netjer	Calf and Cow	Σεβεννύτης Sebennytes	ϫⲉⲙⲛⲟⲩϯ	𓊹𓍿𓃀𓊖 ṯb-nṯr (Tjeb netjer) (Sebennytos)	Samanud	Anhur
13	Heq-At	𓈭	ḥqꜣ-ꜥḏ Heka-Adj	Prospering Sceptre	Ἡλιοπολίτης Heliopolites	ⲱⲛ	jwnw (Iunu)/ In-meḥ/ Iset-Tem/ Igert, Igertet, Iqert, Iugertet (Heliopolis)	Materiya (suburb of Cairo)	Ra
14	Khent-Abt	𓈮	ḫnty-jꜣbty Khenti-Iabti	Foremost of the East	Σεθρωίτης Sethroites		Tjaru/ Dj'anet (Sile, Tanis)	Tell Abu Sefa	Horus
15	Djehuti	𓈯	ḏḥwty Djeḥuti	Thoth	Μενδήσιος Mendesios	ⲛⲓⲙⲉϣϣⲱⲧ	Ba'h / Weprehwy (Hermopolis Parva)	Baqliya	Thoth
16	Kha	𓈰	ḥꜣt-mḥyt Hatmehyt	Fish/ Foremost of the Fish	Μενδήσιος Mendesios	ⲛⲓⲙⲉϣϣⲱⲧ	Djedet/ Ā'atjaba (Mendes)	Tell El Rubˁ	Banebdjedet and Hatmehyt
17	Sema-Beḥut Sema-Beḥut	𓈱/𓈲	bḥdt/smꜣ-bḥdt Behdet/Sema-Behdet	Throne/ Uniting the throne?	Διοπολίτης Κάτω Diospolites Kato	ⲡⲟⲩⲛⲉⲙⲟⲩ	Sema-behdet (Diospolis Inferior)	Tel El Balamun	Amun-Ra
18	Im-Khent	𓈳	jmty-ḫnty Imty Khenti	Southern Prince	Βουβαστίτης Boubastites	ⲡⲟⲩⲃⲁⲥϯ	Per-Bastet (Bubastis)	Tell Bastah (near Zagazig)	Bastet
19	Im-Peḥ	𓈴	jmty-pḥw Imty Pehu	Northern Prince	Τανίτης Tanites	ϫⲁⲛⲏ	Dja'net (Leontopolis Tanis)	Tell Nebesha or San El Hagar	Wadjet
20	Sep-d	𓈵	spdw Sopdu	Sopdu	Ἀραβία Arabia	ϯⲁⲣⲁⲃⲓⲁ	Per-Sopdu	Saft El Hinna	Sopdet

=== Upper Egypt ===
Number	Nome Standard (Symbol on top of head of man or woman)		Ancient Egyptian Nome Name		Capital	Modern Capital	God
Number	Image	Unicode	Transliteration	Translation	Capital	Modern Capital	God
1	Ta-Seti	𓈶	tꜣ-sty Ta-Seti	Land of the bow	𓍋𓃀𓃰𓅱𓎶𓈊 Abu / Yeb [Yb] (Elephantine)	Sunnu/ Irp-Ḥesp (Aswan)	Khnum
2	Wetjes-Her	𓈷	wṯs-ḥrw Wetjes-Hor	Throne of Horus	𓌥𓃀𓊖 Djeba (Apollonopolis Magna)	Behdet/Wetjes-Hor (Edfu)	Horus-Behdety
3	Nekhen	𓈸	nḫn Nekhen	Shrine	Nekhen (Hierakonpolis)	Elkab	Nekhebet
4	Uas (Uaset/ Waset)	𓈹	wꜣst Waset	Sceptre	Waset (Thebes)	Luxor	Amun-Ra
5	Herui	𓈺	bjkwy/nṯrwy/ḥrwy Bikuy/Netjerui/Herui	Two falcons/Two gods/Two Horuses	𓎤𓃀𓅂𓊖 Gebtu/ Iter-Shemā (Coptos)	Qift	Min
6	Iqer Iqer	𓈻	jqr/msḥ Iqer/Meseh	The crocodile	Iunet (Tantere/ Tentyra/ Dendera)	Tantere/ Tentyra/ Dendera	Hathor
7	Seshesh	𓈼	bꜣt/sšš Bat/Seshesh	Bat/Sistrum	Seshesh/ Pa-Khen-Iment/ Uas-Meḥ (Diospolis Parva)	Hu	Hathor
8	Ta-wer	𓈽	tꜣ-wr Ta-wer	Great land	Thinis		Anhur
9	Min	𓈾	mnw Min	Min	Ip/ Ipi/ Ipu/ Apu/ [later: Khen-Min, perhaps another name for "Khemenu"]/ Ārty-Ḥeru (Panopolis)	Akhmim	Min
10	Uadj (Wadjet) Uadj (Wadjet)	𓈿/𓉀	wꜣḏyt Wadjet	Wadjet	Djew-qa / Tjebu (Antaeopolis)	Qaw El Kebir	Hathor
11	Set Set	𓉁/𓉂	šꜣ Sha	Set-animal	Shashotep (Hypselis)	Shutb	Khnum
12	Ta-wer	𓉃	ḏw-ft Dju-fet	Viper mountain	Pr nmty (Hieracon)	al Atawla	Horus
13	Ta-wer	𓉄	ꜣtf ḫntt/nḏft-ḫntt Atef Khentet/ Nedjefet Khentet	Southern ꜣtf/nḏft-Tree	Zawty (z3wj-tj, Lycopolis)	Asyut	Apuat
14	Ta-wer	𓉅	ꜣtf-pḥt/nḏft-pḥt Atef Peht/Nedjfet Peht	Northern ꜣtf/nḏft-Tree	Qesy (Cusae)	El Qusiya	Hathor
15	Ta-wer	𓉆	wnt Wenet	Hare	Khemenu (Hermopolis Magna)	El Ashmounein	Thoth
16	Ta-wer	𓉇	mꜣ-ḥḏ Ma-Ḥedj	Oryx	Herwer?	Hur?	Horus
17	Ta-wer	𓉈	jnpw(t) Anpu/Anput	Anubis/Anput	Saka (Cynopolis)	El Qais	Anubis
18	Ta-wer	𓉉/𓉊	nmty Nemty	Nemty	Teudjoi / Hutnesut (Alabastronopolis)	El Hiba	Anubis
19	Ta-wer	𓉋	wꜣbwy Wabwi/Wabui	Two scepters?	Per-Medjed/ Per-Mādjet/ Uabu-t (Oxyrhynchus)	El Bahnasa	Set
20	Ta-wer	𓉌	nꜥrt-ḫntt Nart Khentet	Southern nꜥrt-tree	Henen-nesut (Herakleopolis Magna)	Ihnasiya	Heryshaf
21	Ta-wer	𓉍	nꜥrt-pḥt Nart Peht	Northern nꜥrt-tree	Shenakhen / Semenuhor/ Ium'ā (Crocodilopolis, Arsinoe)	Faiyum	Khnemu
22	Ta-wer	𓉎/𓉏	mdnjt Mednit/Medenit	Knife	𓁶𓏤𓃒𓏪𓊖 Tepihu (Aphroditopolis)	Atfih	Hathor
