= Ramses Awad =

Egyptian writer and academic (1929–2018)

- رمسيس حنا خليل عوض
- Born: 1929; Maghagha, Minya, Egypt
- Died: 18 November 2018 (aged 89)
- Education: Fuad I University (BA, PhD)
- Occupations: Thinker; Writer; Translator; Academic
- Employer: Ain Shams University
- Known for: Translating works by Bertrand Russell and Naguib Mahfouz
- Notable work: Bertrand Russell the Man (1961); Translation of The Beginning and the End
- Title: Head of the English Language Department
- Relatives: Louis Awad (brother)

Ramses Awad (Arabic: رمسيس حنا خليل عوض; 1929 – 18 November 2018) or professionally known as Ramses Hanna Khalil Awad was an Egyptian thinker, writer, translator, and academic. He served as the head of the English Language Department at Ain Shams University.

He authored over 60 books in Arabic and around 20 in English. He translated several works by the British philosopher Bertrand Russell into Arabic. He also translated Naguib Mahfouz's novel The Beginning and the End into English, published in 1985 by the American University in Cairo Press. He was the brother of the thinker and translator Louis Awad.

== Life ==
Ramses Awad was born in Maghagha, Minya, in 1929. He graduated from the English Department of Fuad I University in 1950 and earned his PhD in 1956. He published his first book, Bertrand Russell the Man, in 1961.

His relationship with his older brother, the thinker Louis Awad, was complex. Although Ramses considered him his role model, their relationship became strained after Louis published his memoirs, Awraq Al-Umr (Pages of a Lifetime), in 1989. After Louis's death in 1990, Ramses collected his articles on the French Revolution and published them in a book in 1992.

== Translation ==
In addition to Bertrand Russell, Ramses Awad translated the works and biographies of several prominent world writers, such as William Shakespeare, George Orwell, and Oscar Wilde from Britain, and Fyodor Dostoevsky and Vladimir Nabokov from Russia.

In a 2002 statement to the newspaper Asharq Al-Awsat, Awad expressed his opinion on the deteriorating state of translation. He attributed this decline to poor academic training, modern translators' lack of deep proficiency in the Arabic language and its classical sources, and the poor financial and moral returns for the profession. He also suggested the creation of an entity to defend translators' rights and a specialized magazine to support them.

== See also ==
- Louis Awad
- Salama Moussa
