= Matai, Egypt =

Matai مَطَاي
- City
- Location in Egypt
- Coordinates: 28°25′N 30°45′E
- Country: Egypt
- Governorate: Minya

Area
  - Total: 5.1 sq mi (13.3 km^{2})
- Elevation: 130 ft (40 m)

Population (2021)
  - Total: 82,328
  - Density: 16,000/sq mi (6,190/km^{2})
- Time zone: UTC+2 (EET)
  - Summer (DST): UTC+3 (EEST)

Matai (Arabic: مَطَاي) is a city in the Minya Governorate in Upper Egypt. It lies between Samalout and Beni Mazar. It is identified with the ancient town of Matoi (Ancient Greek: Ματοι, Coptic: ⲙⲙⲁⲧⲟⲓ, ⲙⲁⲛⲙⲁⲧⲟⲓ) and its name comes from the Coptic word for "soldier" (Coptic: ⲙⲁⲧⲟⲓ, matoi).

== Villages ==
The city of Matai has the following villages:

- Abu Aziz
- Abu Haseba
- Abu Shehata
- Abwan
- Bany Hassan
- Bardnouha
- El-Farokeya
- El-Kawady
- El-Kofor
- El Manahra
- Helwa
- Kom Matai
- Marzok
- Matai El-Balad
- Menbal
- Nazlet Amr
- Nazlet Thabet
- Selah El-Gharbiya
- gabal elter
- Gawada
- shark almahata
- alfawareqa

== Notable people ==
- Saint Abdel Messih El-Makari

== See also ==
- List of cities and towns in Egypt
