= Aba al-Waqf =

Aba al-Waqf أبا الوقف Abā al Waqf
- Village
- Location in Egypt
- Coordinates: 28.58721°N 30.76926°E
- Country: Egypt
- Governorate: Minya
- Elevation: 148 ft (45 m)
- Time zone: UTC+2 (EET)
  - Summer (DST): UTC+3 (EEST)

Aba al-Waqf (Arabic: أبا الوقف, romanized: Abā al Waqf) is a village in the markaz of Maghagha in Minya Governorate, Egypt. It is about 6 miles (9.7 km) south of Maghagha, and 2 miles (3.2 km) west of the Nile.

== Etymology ==
The name of the village comes from Egyptian jp.t "harem" (Ancient Greek: Ὠφις). The Coptic and the Greek name of Luxor (Coptic: ⲡⲁⲡⲉ, Ancient Greek: Ἀπις, Ὠφιεῖον) also share the same etymology.

== History ==
In the late 1800s, Aba al-Waqf was the site of one of the largest sugar mills in the world. The mill, which belonged to the Khedive, was constructed beginning in 1872 on the banks of the Ibrahimiya Canal.

The 1885 Census of Egypt recorded Aba al-Waqf (as Aba-el-Wakf) in the district of Beni Mazar in Minya Governorate; at that time, the population of the city was 4,546 (2,293 men and 2,253 women).
