= Abdel Messih El-Makari =

Coptic Orthodox monk and priest

Saint Abdel Messih el-Makari

Monk
- Born: 11 November 1892; Matai, Khedivate of Egypt
- Died: 14 April 1963; Matai, Egypt
- Venerated in: Coptic Orthodox Church
- Feast: 14 April (6 Parmouti)

Abdel Messih El-Makari (or El-Manahri; 11 November 1892–14 April 1963) was a Coptic Orthodox monk and priest, and a 20th-century Coptic saint. Pope Cyril VI of Alexandria testified as to his holiness and asceticism.

== Life ==
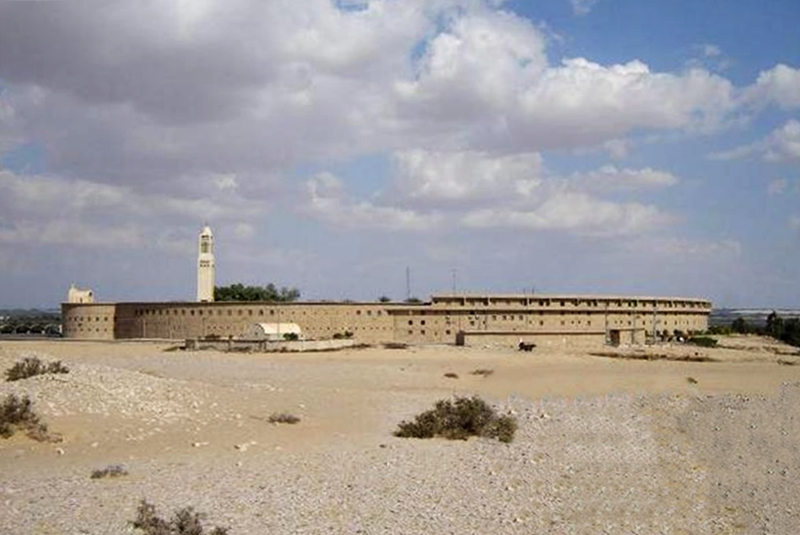
Monastery of Saint Macarius the Great

Abdel Messih El-Makari was born in 1892 in the village of Abou Shehata, Matai district, El-Menya governorate, Egypt. His father, Henein, and his mother, Esther, were both Christians. As a young adult, El-Makari left his home town for the Monastery of Saint Samuel the Confessor in el-Qalamun mountain. He did this several times, whereupon his father would come to the monastery to take him back home (events associated with the death of a large number of his father's cattle). His father later relented and allowed him to join Monastery of Saint Macarius in the desert of Scetes (Wadi El-Natrun), becoming a monk.

He later moved to El-Manahra village, Matai. El-Makari was known for his humility and asceticism. It is said that he had the gifts of prescience, discerning of spirits and healing the sick. He was very compassionate and gave everything he was given to the needy.

He died on Easter Sunday morning on 14 April 1963 / 6 (Parmouti 1669 A.M.)

== See also ==
- Coptic Saints
- Coptic Orthodox Church
- Samuel of Dabra Wagag
