= Nikaiankh I =

Ancient Egyptian local official

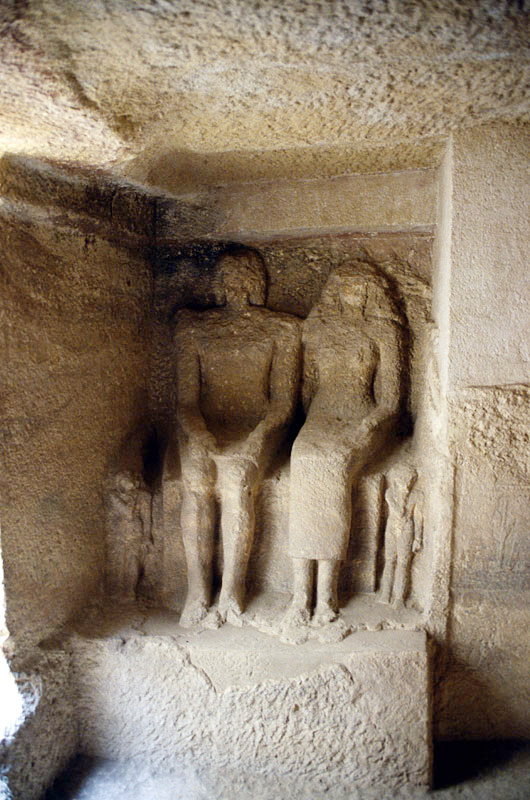
Nikaiankh and his wife

Nikaiankh I was an Ancient Egyptian local official who his known from his rock cut tomb at Tehna, about 2 km south of Akoris.

In his tomb Nikaiankh bears the titles royal acquaintance (rekh-niswt), steward of the great estate (imi-ra pr hut aat), overseer of the new settlements and overseer of the priests of Hathor. lady of Rainet. His wife was a woman with the name Hedjethekenu, She was also given the title (female) royal acquaintance.

His rock cut tomb (no. 13) copies a mastaba. It is cut into the rocky mountain. Mastabas are normally free standing monuments built of stones or mud brick. However, in this case it is carved in the rocks. It has an inner chapel and two shafts going done to burial chambers/ The chapel is decorated with reliefs showing Nikaiankh and his family. There are also several statues carved into the rock, showing again Nikaiankh and family members.

The tomb was first fully recorded by George Willoughby Fraser and is therefore one of the Fraser Tombs that were all recorded by this scholar. From 2007 to 2011, an Australian team worked at these tombs and published three of them in a monograph.

== Literature ==
- Elizabeth Thompson (2014): The Old Kingdom cemetery at Tehna. Volume I: The tombs of Nikaiankh I, Nikaiankh II and Kaihep (= Australian Centre for Egyptology: Reports. Band 35). Oxford, ISBN 978-0-85668-865-2, pp. 21–59, plates3–25, 49–58.
- George Willoughby Fraser (1903): The early tombs at Tehneh. In: Annales du Service des Antiquités de l'Égypte. Band 3. Imprimerie de l'Institut français d'archéologie orientale, Le Caire 1903, pp 122–130 (online).
