= Anba Agapius =

Egyptian Coptic Orthodox bishop (1944–2025)

- Native name: الأنبا أغابيوس
- Church: Coptic Orthodox Church
- Diocese: Diocese of Deir Mawas and Delga
- Appointed: 13 November 1988
- Predecessor: Diocese newly established
- Successor: Anba Boktor

Orders
- Ordination: 17 July 1979
- Consecration: 13 November 1988
- Rank: Metropolitan (from 20 November 2022)

Personal details
- Born: Michel Masoud; April 2, 1944 Zagazig, Sharqia Governorate, Egypt
- Died: February 4, 2025 (aged 80) Cairo, Egypt
- Buried: Monastery of the Virgin Mary and Anba Ibrahim, Delga
- Education: B.Sc. in Agriculture, 1968
- Alma mater: Cairo University

Anba Agapius (Arabic: الأنبا أغابيوس; born Michel Masoud; 2 April 1944 – 4 February 2025) was an Egyptian Coptic Orthodox bishop who served as the first bishop of the Diocese of Deir Mawas and Delga in Minya Governorate, Egypt. He served in the diocese from 1988 until his death and was elevated to the rank of metropolitan in 2022.

== Early life ==
Michel Masoud was born on 2 April 1944 in Zagazig, Sharqia Governorate, Egypt. He studied agriculture at Cairo University and graduated with a bachelor's degree in 1968.

After graduating, he worked as an agricultural engineer in Tanta and later as a supply inspector. He also served in churches in Tanta before entering monastic life.

== Monastic life ==
In 1977, Masoud left his employment and joined Saint Bishoy Monastery in Wadi El Natrun. He was tonsured as a monk on 15 December 1977 under the name Wissa Anba Bishoy. He was ordained a priest on 17 July 1979 and was elevated to the rank of Hegumen in 1981.

He later served in several churches in Cairo before being appointed to the episcopate.

== Bishop of Deir Mawas and Delga ==
=== Consecration and early ministry ===
On 13 November 1988, Pope Shenouda III consecrated Agapius as the first bishop of the newly established Diocese of Deir Mawas and Delga. He was formally enthroned on 5 August 1989.

Agapius remained bishop of the diocese for more than three decades. During his tenure, the diocese expanded its churches and administrative facilities and became involved in a number of public issues affecting the Coptic community in the area.

=== Father Wissa Sobhi ===
One of the priests associated with the administration of the diocese during Agapius's episcopate was Father Wissa Sobhi Tadrous, later a hegumen. He was ordained to the priesthood in 1991 and served at St. George's Church, Deir Mawas. The Coptic priest directory of St-Takla.org identifies him as the deputy of the Diocese of Deir Mawas.

Contemporary reporting also identified Sobhi as Agapius's deputy. In a German-language report published in 2010, the two are described in connection with the Deir Mawas diocese, with Sobhi referred to as Agapius's deputy.

Sobhi was mentioned in Egyptian press reports in connection with the affairs of the diocese. In 2007, he was reported as being present with Agapius and other representatives of the diocese during a dispute over church property in Deir Mawas.

His name also appeared in English-language reporting. In September 2013, Coptic Solidarity reported meeting Father Wissa Sobhi in Deir Mawas and accompanying him while documenting damage to shops and other properties following the violence of that year.

An English-language article published by RAWI also quoted Father Wissa Sobhi, identified as a priest of the Deir Mawas bishopric, in connection with the history and condition of Coptic churches affected by the violence of 2013.

Later accounts of Sobhi's service state that he became the diocesan deputy in 1991 and was involved in administrative and construction projects in the diocese, including the development of St. George's Church in Deir Mawas and other church facilities.

These reports place Sobhi among the clergy who worked in the administration of the Diocese of Deir Mawas and Delga during Agapius's episcopate.

=== 2013 violence ===
In August 2013, churches and Christian properties in parts of Minya Governorate were attacked amid the violence that followed the dispersal of the Rabaa sit-in. Christian sites in Deir Mawas and nearby Delga were among those affected.

The Monastery of the Virgin Mary and Anba Ibrahim in Delga was also damaged. Agapius spoke publicly about the situation in Delga and called for security measures and the restoration of damaged Christian properties.

The events also brought Father Wissa Sobhi into contact with foreign observers and journalists. Coptic Solidarity reported that he accompanied visitors through Deir Mawas to document the damage, while RAWI later quoted him on the condition and history of churches affected during the unrest.

=== Later years ===
In October 2020, Pope Tawadros II met with Agapius to discuss the pastoral affairs of the Diocese of Deir Mawas and Delga.

In July 2024, Pope Tawadros II met with the clergy of the diocese to review its pastoral and administrative activities.

=== Elevation to metropolitan ===
On 20 November 2022, Pope Tawadros II elevated Agapius to the rank of metropolitan, together with a number of other Coptic bishops.

== Death and burial ==
Agapius died in Cairo on 4 February 2025, aged 80.

Pope Tawadros II presided over his funeral at Saint Mark's Cathedral in Cairo on 5 February 2025. A second funeral service was held in Deir Mawas, after which Agapius was buried at the Monastery of the Virgin Mary and Anba Ibrahim in Delga.

== Succession ==
Following Agapius's death, Pope Tawadros II appointed Metropolitan Demetrius of Mallawi as papal representative for the Diocese of Deir Mawas and Delga.

On 1 June 2025, Pope Tawadros II consecrated Anba Boktor as the new bishop of the diocese.

== See also ==
- Diocese of Deir Mawas and Delga
- Anba Boktor
- Monastery of the Virgin Mary and Anba Ibrahim (Delga)
- Deir Mawas
- Saint Bishoy Monastery
- Coptic Orthodox Church
- Shenouda III
- Tawadros II
