= Diocese of Deir Mawas and Delga =

Coptic diocese in Egypt founded 1988

Location
- Territory: Deir Mawas, Delga, and surrounding villages, Minya Governorate, Egypt
- Headquarters: Deir Mawas, Minya Governorate

Information
- Established: 13 November 1988

The Diocese of Deir Mawas and Delga (Arabic: إيبارشية دير مواس ودلجا) is a Coptic Orthodox diocese covering the city of Deir Mawas, the village of Delga, and surrounding villages in Minya Governorate, Egypt. It was created on 13 November 1988 and is part of the Holy Synod of the Coptic Orthodox Church.

== Territory ==
The diocese covers Deir Mawas and the village of Delga, which lies to its south-west near the border with Asyut Governorate. It also includes smaller surrounding villages such as Nuzlet Abd al-Masih, Nuzlet al-Badraman, Awlad Marjan, al-Rahmaniyya, Tanuf, Tukh, and Awdeh Basha.

== History ==
=== Early Christian presence ===
The Deir Mawas area has had a Christian community since the early centuries of the faith. The Monastery of the Virgin Mary and Anba Ibrahim in Delga is one of the oldest monastic sites in Upper Egypt, with origins in the 4th century AD. Medieval sources including al-Maqrizi counted 24 churches in Delga at one point in history.

=== Foundation (1988) ===
The diocese was formally created on 13 November 1988, when Pope Shenouda III consecrated Anba Agapius as its first bishop. He was formally enthroned on 5 August 1989.

=== August 2013 attacks ===
In August 2013, after the dispersal of the Rabaa El-Adaweya sit-in, several church buildings in the diocese were attacked. These included the Monastery of the Virgin Mary and Anba Ibrahim in Delga, Saint Lazarus Church in Deir Mawas, and the Good Shepherd service building. Around 150 Coptic families left Delga during this period. The damaged buildings were later restored with state assistance.

== Bishops ==
#	Name	Tenure	Notes
1	Anba Agapius	1988–2025	Consecrated 13 November 1988; elevated to Metropolitan 20 November 2022
2	Anba Boktor	2025–present	Consecrated 1 June 2025; enthroned 20 June 2025

=== Anba Agapius (1988–2025) ===
Anba Agapius was born Michel Masoud on 2 April 1944 in Zagazig, Sharqia Governorate. He graduated from the Faculty of Agriculture at Cairo University in 1968. He entered Saint Bishoy Monastery in Wadi El Natrun and was tonsured a monk on 15 December 1977. He was ordained a priest on 17 July 1979.

Pope Shenouda III consecrated him the first bishop of the diocese on 13 November 1988. During his 36 years as bishop, the diocese built Saint George's Cathedral, the diocesan headquarters, and numerous parish churches across the diocese. Pope Tawadros II elevated him to Metropolitan on 20 November 2022.

He fell ill in January 2025 and died on 4 February 2025, aged 80. His funeral was led by Pope Tawadros II at Saint Mark's Cathedral in Cairo. He was buried at the Monastery of the Virgin Mary and Anba Ibrahim in Delga, as he had requested.

=== Anba Boktor (2025–present) ===
After the death of Anba Agapius, Pope Tawadros II appointed Metropolitan Demetrius of Mallawi as temporary representative of the diocese. On 1 June 2025, Pope Tawadros II consecrated Anba Boktor as the new bishop at Saint Mark's Cathedral in Cairo. He was formally enthroned at Saint George's Cathedral in Deir Mawas on 20 June 2025.

Anba Boktor was born on 5 August 1975. He was tonsured a monk at the Monastery of Saint George in al-Khatatba under the monastic name Daniel al-Jawraji and was ordained a priest on 13 January 2012. After his consecration, he held his first meeting with the diocese's clergy and began pastoral visits to the villages of the diocese.

== Diocesan administration ==
=== Deputy of the diocese ===
The diocese is administered day-to-day by a deputy (وكيل, Wakīl), appointed by the bishop. Hegumen Wissa Sobhy has held this role since 1991. He was born on 4 December 1956 in Tanta and holds a Bachelor of Commerce from Tanta University (1980). He was ordained a priest on 11 February 1991 by Bishop Agapius and Bishop Thomas of Qusiya and Meir, and was elevated to Hegumen (Archpriest) on 22 June 1997.

In 1991, he established the diocese's first civil documentation and marriage registration office. Over three decades, he supervised the construction of Saint George's Cathedral as a four-storey building (completed 2004), the diocesan headquarters, and several parish churches.

He served as the diocese's official spokesperson during several periods of tension, including disturbances in April 2007 and the August 2013 attacks. In 2013, he spoke to national media about the damage to church property, the displacement of around 150 Coptic families from Delga, and coordinated with authorities on restoration work.

== Churches ==
=== Deir Mawas city ===
- Saint George's Cathedral (main cathedral)
- The Virgin Mary Church (diocesan headquarters)
- Saint Lazarus Church
- Saint Paul Church

=== Delga village ===
- The ancient Church of the Virgin Mary and Anba Ibrahim (4th century)
- Anba Bishoy Church
- Saint Peter Church
- Saint John the Baptist Church

=== Surrounding villages ===
- Saint George Church, Nuzlet Abd al-Masih
- Saint George Church, Nuzlet al-Badraman
- Saint Menas Church, Awlad Marjan
- Archangel Michael Church, al-Rahmaniyya
- Virgin Mary Church, Mahram village
- Saint Mark Church, Tanuf
- Saint George Church, Awdeh Basha
- Saint George Church, al-Nagarin
- Saint Damiana Church, Azbet al-Sett
- Prophet Moses Church, al-Amriyya al-Sharqiyya

== See also ==
- Deir Mawas
- Minya Governorate
- Coptic Orthodox Church
- Pope Shenouda III
- Pope Tawadros II
