= Deir el-Garnus =

Village in Minya, Egypt

Deir al-Garnus دير الجرنوس
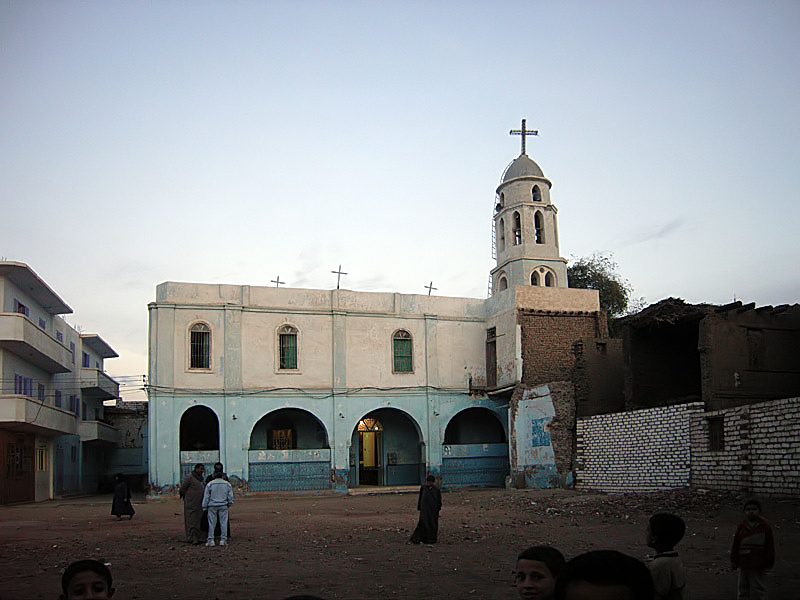
- Church of the Holy Virgin in Deir al-Garnus

- Location in Egypt
- Coordinates: 28°36′36″N 30°42′24″E
- Country: Egypt
- Governorate: Minya
- Time zone: UTC+2 (EET)
  - Summer (DST): UTC+3 (EEST)

Deir el-Garnus (Arabic: دير الجرنوس) is a village in Upper Egypt near Maghagha. It is located in Minya Governorate on the shore of Bahr Yussef and has a predominantly Coptic Christian population of 6,504 people.

== Etymology ==
Deir means "monastery" and el-Garnus comes from an older name of the village Arganus (Arabic: أرجنوس), which probably comes from Ancient Greek: ὄργανος, lit. 'water-machine, saqiyyah' and refers to the ancient Nilometer in the village. In some texts the monastery is called Pei-Isous (Coptic: ⲡⲏⲓ ⲓⲥⲟⲩⲥ), Beyt Isus or Deir Bisus (Arabic: دير بيسوس), all meaning "house of Jesus".

== History ==
The modern village developed from a monastery visited by the Holy Family during their Flight into Egypt on their way to Hermopolis. The legend says that Jesus dug a well with water that cured every disease. It was also believed to foretell the height of the annual Nile's inundation. The church of the Holy Virgin was built on a site of this well in the 6th century (now ruined, the modern church was built around 1870, but the remains of the old church are still present), and the festival was held on the 25th of Pashons to predict the Nile's flooding. Another festival attended by thousands of pilgrims is celebrated on 15th and 16th of Mesori.
