= Akoris =

Akoris may refer to:

- Hakor, (or Akoris), a Pharaoh of Egypt from 393 BC to 380 BC
- Akoris, Egypt, an ancient Egyptian site 40km north of Hermopolis Magna
