= Lotus University in Minya =

Private university in New Minya, Egypt

Lotus University
- جامعة اللوتس
- Type: Private university
- Established: 2019
- Location: New Minya, Egypt; 28.1248°N 30.8480°E
- Website: lum.edu.eg

Lotus University in Minya (LUM; Arabic: جامعة اللوتس) is a private university located in New Minya, Minya Governorate, Egypt. It was established in 2019 via Article 4 of Republican Decree No. 631.

The university has five faculties:

- Oral and dental medicine
- Physical therapy
- Nursing
- Computers and information technology
- Management, economics, and political science
