= Ishnin al-Nasara =

Village in Minya Governorate, Egypt

Ishnin al-Nasara إشنين النصارى
- Location in Egypt
- Coordinates: 28°36′49″N 30°46′26″E
- Country: Egypt
- Governorate: Minya
- Time zone: UTC+2 (EET)
  - Summer (DST): UTC+3 (EEST)

Ishnin al-Nasara (Arabic: إشنين النصارى) is a village in the Minya Governorate, Egypt.

The village of Ishnin al-Nasara is notable for its historical association with Christianity, as indicated by the term "al-Nasara" meaning "the Nazarenes" in the Islamic religion.

In Christianity, Ishnin al-Nasara is part of the Holy Family trail in Egypt.
