= Acoris =

Acoris may refer to:

- Akoris, Egypt, an ancient town in Egypt
- Hakor, a pharaoh of ancient Egypt
