= Bani Khalaf =

Village in Minya Governorate, Egypt

- Village
- Location in Egypt
- Coordinates: 28°38′41.05″N 30°45′44.12″E
- Country: Egypt
- Governorate: Minya
- Municipality: Maghagha

Population (2006)
  - Total: 4,370
- Time zone: UTC+2 (EET)
  - Summer (DST): UTC+3 (EEST)

Bani Khalaf (Arabic: بني خلف) is a village in Egypt in the Minya Governorate, within the municipality of Maghagha. In 2006, it had a population of 4,370 people.
