= Maghagha =

Maghagha مغاغة
- City
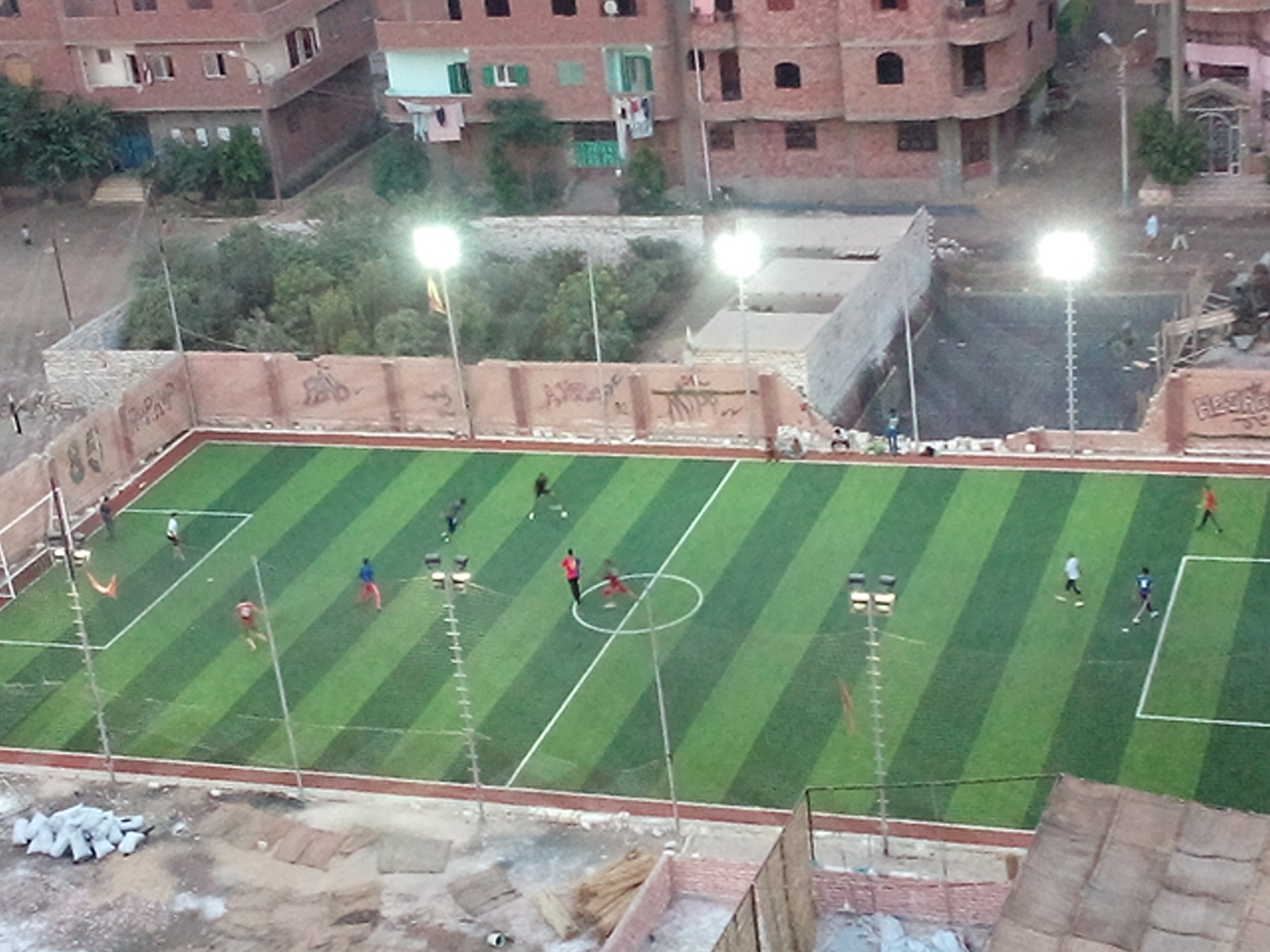
- Football stadium in Maghagha.

- Location in Egypt
- Coordinates: 28°39′N 30°51′E
- Country: Egypt
- Governorate: Minya
- Time zone: UTC+2 (EET)
  - Summer (DST): UTC+3 (EEST)

Maghagha (Arabic: مغاغة) is a city in Egypt, located on the west bank of the Nile. It is the northernmost city in the Minya Governorate.

== History ==
The old names of the town were Nimoui (Arabic: نموى, from Coptic: ⲛⲓⲙⲟⲩⲓ, lit. 'islands') and Gazirat al-Hagar (Arabic: جزيرة الحجر, lit. 'stone islands').

In May 1963, the ferry boat Adel capsized here, killing 206 people.

In June 2007, 11-year-old schoolgirl Budour Ahmed Shaker died at a private clinic in Maghagha after an excessive dose of anesthesia while undergoing the procedure of female genital cutting, sparking widespread protests and prompting the Egyptian government to outlaw the practice by closing a legal loophole allowing it to be performed for "documented health reasons". The ban instead drove the practice underground, with doctors charging higher fees to compensate for the risk of being prosecuted.

The 1885 Census of Egypt recorded Maghagha (as Maghaghah) as a nahiyah in under the district of El Fashn in Minya Governorate; at that time, the population of the town was 3,126 (1,548 men and 1,578 women).

In 1888, a travel guide by the British publishing house John Murray described Maghagha as possessing one of the most important sugar factories in Egypt, with large tracts around the town being devoted to the cultivation of cane sugar, although the amount of sugar produced at the factory had diminished in recent years. There was a branch line connecting Maghagha to Aba al-Waqf and Beni Mazar; it was used to transport cane sugar to sugar mills during the harvest season. The guide also described several ancient ruins in the area, with a cemetery for dog mummies. Just upstream from Maghagha was a rock called the Hagar es-Salaam, or "stone of welfare", in the Nile near the shore. Local boatmen claimed that no journey down the Nile would be prosperous until passing this rock.

== Villages ==
- Aba al-Waqf
- Ashnin
- Beni Khaled
- Bortbat El Gabal
- Dahmro
- Deir el-Garnus
- El A'bor
- El Kom El Akhdar
- Malatya
- Mayana El Wakf
- Sharona
- Tanbdy
- Bani Khalaf

== Economy ==
Maghagha's souk is one of only two in Egypt to be government-owned (the other is in Shibin el-Kom), with fixed rental fees for vendors. Other markets in Maghagha district are privately owned, with varying rental rates. These markets are mostly held on different days, to reduce competition with one another and allow merchants to attend several different ones in the same week. To that end, some of the markets have been rescheduled in the past: for example, the souk in Bani Khalid was established in the 1940s and was originally held on Sundays. However, in the mid-1970s, improved transportation led to the market being rescheduled to Tuesdays, to reduce competition with the market in Saqola. The markets that are held on the same day owe their coexistence to distance and size factors. For example, there are three souks held on Thursday in the district: in Maghagha itself as well as in the villages of Bani Wallims (18km from Maghagha) and Shim al-Basal al-Bahariya (14km). The latter two souks are smaller ones (or suwayqas) with no more than 70 vendors; they mostly cater to the needs of local residents.

The following table shows the date and location of the various souks in Maghagha district:

Name	Market day	Direction from Maghagha
Barabat	Saturday	Southwest
Saqola	Sunday	Southwest
Aba al-Waqf	Monday	South
Bani Khalid	Tuesday	West
Shim al-Basal al-Qibliya	Wednesday	Southwest
Shim al-Basal al-Bahariya	Thursday	Southwest
Bani Wallims	Thursday	Southwest
Maghagha	Thursday	--
al-Qayat	Friday	West
Tanbidi	Tuesday	West

== Notable people ==
- Taha Hussein, 20th century writer and intellectual associated with the Nahda and modernist movements
- Ahmed Hassan, former footballer
- Hakim, pop singer
