= Fraser Tombs =

Archaeological site in Middle Egypt

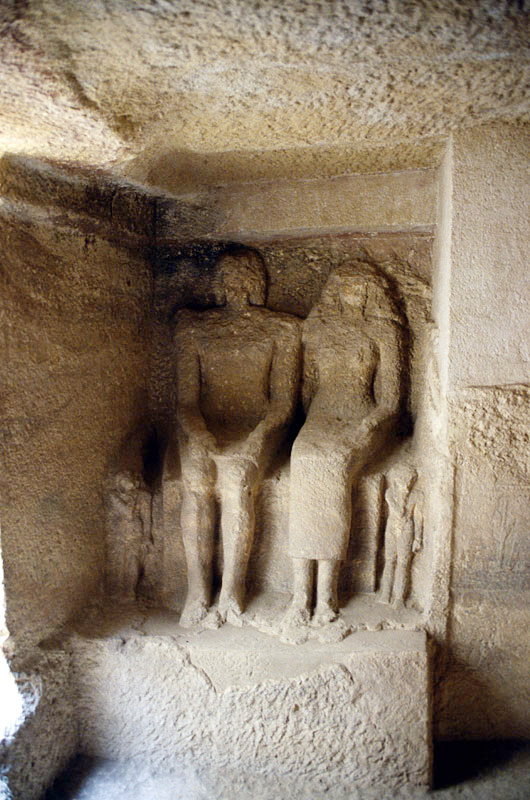
Inside the tomb of Nikaiankh I and his family

The Fraser Tombs are a necropolis located 10 km (6.2 mi) northeast of Al Minya, Upper Egypt. They sit around 2 km (1.2 mi) south of Tihna el-Gebel village, which was an ancient limestone quarry.

The rock-cut sepulchres date to the Fourth and Fifth Dynasties of the Old Kingdom.

These tombs were first discovered in the fall of 1853 by the German Egyptologist Heinrich Brugsch and first described by the British civil engineer George Willoughby Fraser, whose name was given to these tombs.

The tombs belong to a 3 km (1.9 mi) long necropolis of the ancient town of Akoris. The tomb owners were stewards of the royal estate (Nikaiankh I, Nikaiankh II, Kaihep). In the Fifth Dynasty, they were Hathor priests and there is a temple to Hathor nearby.

Four of the fifteen (numbered) tombs contain statues and carved hieroglyphs dating from the Old Kingdom. The most important of the sepulchres is the second tomb which is probably the tomb of Nikaiankh, which has the shape of a mastaba. The decoration of the small and long offering room consists of statues of his family.

A written authorization or will was discovered in the tomb of Nikaiankh stating "they shall act under the authority of my eldest son, like they act for my own property".

The Supreme Council of Antiquities of Egypt says there are many tombs and ancient ruins in Tihna el-Gebel which are available to the public. The Fraser Tombs are open to the public but are rarely visited by tourists, perhaps because the only way to reach them is by taxi, with a police escort, due to heightened security in the area. An excellent video of the exterior of the area is a 360° video available and narrated on YouTube, and available as virtual reality on Google Cardboard, Google's virtual reality platform.
