= New Minya =

New Minya المنيا الجديدة
- Town
- Location in Egypt
- Coordinates: 28.119444°N 30.744444°E
- Country: Egypt
- Governorate: Minya

Area
  - Total: 36.7 km^{2} (14.2 sq mi)

Population (2023)
  - Total: 94,000
  - Density: 2,600/km^{2} (6,600/sq mi)
- Time zone: UTC+2 (EET)
  - Summer (DST): UTC+3 (EEST)

New Minya (Arabic: المنيا الجديدة) is a town in the Minya Governorate, Egypt. The town is located on the right bank of the Nile across from Old Minya. Construction of the planned town began in 1991 and was carried out by the New Urban Communities Authority. Its population was estimated at 94,000 people in 2024.

Lotus University is located in New Minya.
