= The 21 =

Animated short film inspired by real events

- Directed by: Tod Polson
- Written by: Tod Polson
- Produced by: Mandi Hart
- Music by: Sarah Ayoub; Laura Ayoub
- Production company: MORE Productions
- Release date: 13 August 2024
- Running time: 13 minutes
- Countries: Egypt; United States; United Kingdom

The 21 is a 13-minute Egyptian, American and British animated short film about faith and martyrdom, directed by Tod Polson. The film honours and retells the story of the 21 Coptic Christians who were murdered by ISIS in Libya in 2015. On December 17, 2024, The 21 was shortlisted for the 97th Academy Awards in the category of Best Animated Short Film.

== Plot ==
Between December 2014 and January 2015, 21 men were kidnapped, held captive and tortured by ISIS terrorists in Libya. They were given a chance to obtain freedom by converting to Islam, but all of them refused to renounce Christianity. Eventually, they were beheaded on a Libyan beach, and their brutal execution was filmed and published by ISIS in a 5-minute video.

== Inspiration ==
On February 15, 2015, ISIS published a video of the murder of 21 Coptic Christians who had been captured in Libya between December 2014 and January 2015. The majority of the men were construction workers from Egypt, with the exception of one man from Ghana. During their captivity, the men were tortured and asked to convert to Islam, but all refused to reject their Christian faith. For this reason, the victims of the massacre were declared as Christian martyrs by the Coptic Orthodox Church in 2015 and by the Catholic Church in 2023. Both Churches commemorate their deaths on February 15.

== Production ==
In order to accurately honour the Coptic Christian faith and traditions, MORE Productions worked with dozens of Coptic Christians, including iconographers and animators, to develop a visual style that heavily leans into symbolism and resembles the traditional Coptic iconography of Christian martyrs. Director Tod Polson travelled to Egypt to visit the men's home province, and spoke to the families of the victims, as well as former ISIS members, and journalists associated with the Libyan army. The film was produced over five years by a global team of more than 70 artists from 24 countries, many of them members of the global Copt community.
