= Sharuna =

Archaeological site in Egypt

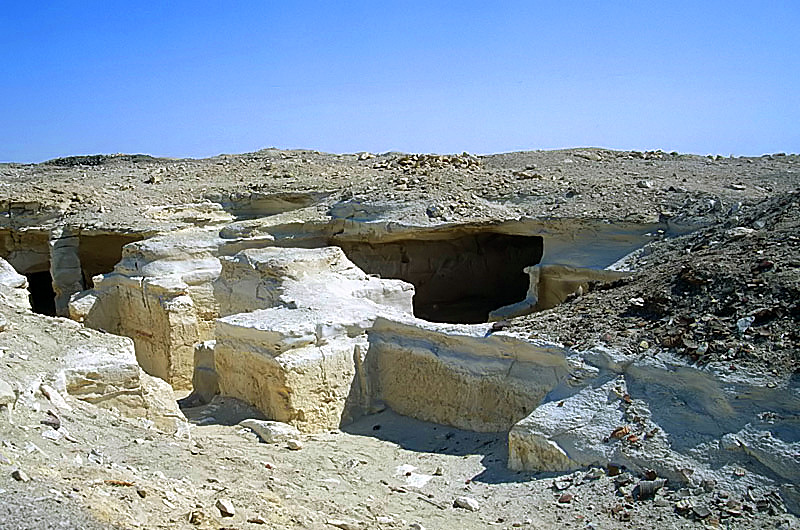

- Location in Egypt
- Coordinates: 28°35′39″N 30°51′01″E
- Country: Egypt
- Governorate: Minya
- Time zone: UTC+2 (EET)
  - Summer (DST): UTC+3 (EEST)

Sharuna (Arabic: شارونة, romanized: Shārūnah) is an archaeological site in central Egypt. It was a settlement in ancient Egypt, located east of the Nile, almost opposite of Per Medjed. It was occupied from the Old Kingdom of Egypt until the Late Roman/Byzantine period. Archaeological excavation of the site began in 1984 and have continued through 2010, locating numerous tombs, temples and churches.

The modern village that stands at this site is called el-Kom el-Ahmar Sawaris. It is located 3 km south of the modern village of Sharuna. It is within the boundaries of the modern Al Minya Governorate.

== Overview ==
Sharuna was a settlement in ancient Egypt, located east of the Nile, almost opposite of Per Medjed. It was occupied from the Old Kingdom of Egypt until the Late Roman/Byzantine period. Today, it is an archaeological site in central Egypt.

Some of the old city's remains include tombs of the late Old Kingdom, the remains of a destroyed Ptolemaic temple, funerary structures from the Ancient Kingdom, the First Middle Period, a funerary church from the Late Roman/Byzantine era, and the Deir el-Qarabin monastery that was used by Coptic Christians.

The site was excavated by the Institut für die Kulturen des Alten Orients at Eberhard Karls Universität Tübingen with funding from DFG, the Egyptian Museum of Barcelona, and Fundaciò Arqueològica Clos. A total of six excavations of the main necropolis area of later Roman occupation were conducted between 2006 and 2010. These were led by Beatrice Huber. Earlier excavations were conducted, beginning in 1984.

The Museum of Fine Arts, Budapest has a relief fragment from the Ptholemaic temple in its collection.

== Location ==
The modern village that stands at this site is called el-Kom el-Ahmar Sawaris. It is located 3 km south of the modern village of Sharuna. It is within the boundaries of the modern Al Minya Governorate.

== See also ==
- List of ancient Egyptian sites, including sites of temples
