= Nikaiankh II =

Ancient Egyptian local official

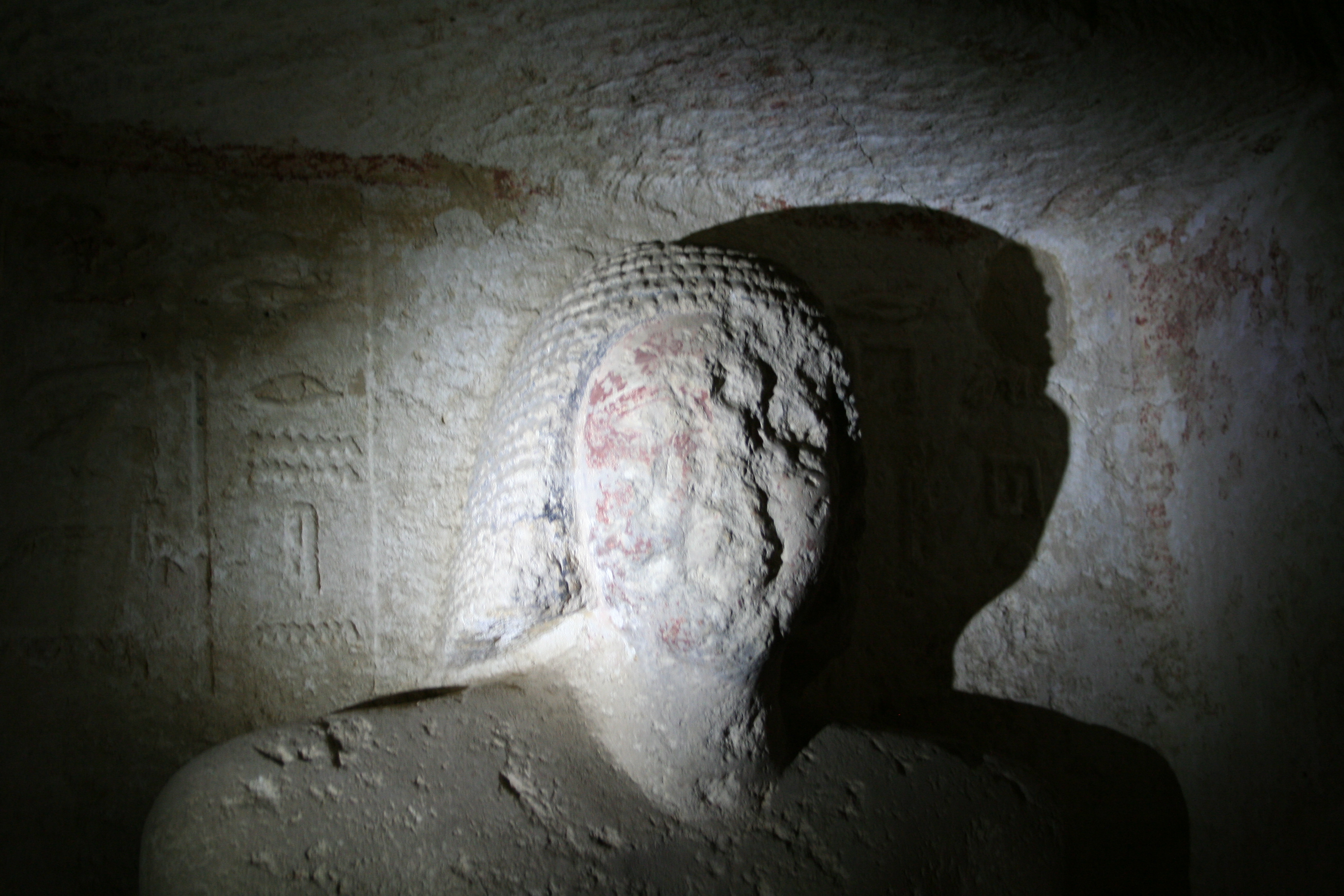
Statue Heti, father Nikaianck

Nikaiankh II was an Ancient Egyptian local official who his known from his rock cut tomb at Tehna (tomb no. 15), about 2 km south of Akoris.

In his tomb Nikaiankh bears the titles royal acquaintance (rekh-niswt), steward of the great estate (imi-ra pr hut aat), and overseer of the priests of Hathor, lady of Rainet. His parents were called Debet (mother) and Heti. Several children are known, but the name of the wife is lost.

His rock cut tomb copies a mastaba. It is cut into the rocky mountain. Mastabas are normally free standing monuments built of stones or mud brick. However, in this case it is carved in the rocks. It has an inner chapel and three shafts going done to burial chambers. The chapel is decorated with reliefs showing Nikaiankh and his family. There are also several statues carved into the rock, showing again Nikaiankh and family members.

The tomb was first fully recorded between 2007 and 2011 by an Australian team that copied and photographed several decorated tombs at Tehna and published three of them in a monograph.

== Literature ==
- Elizabeth Thompson (2014): The Old Kingdom cemetery at Tehna. Volume I: The tombs of Nikaiankh I, Nikaiankh II and Kaihep (= Australian Centre for Egyptology: Reports. Band 35). Oxford, ISBN 978-0-85668-865-2, pp. 60–82, plates 26–40, 59–64.
