= 21 Coptic Christian Martyrs of Libya =

Coptic Christians murdered by ISIL, Martyrs and Saints

Saints 21 Coptic Christian Martyrs of Libya
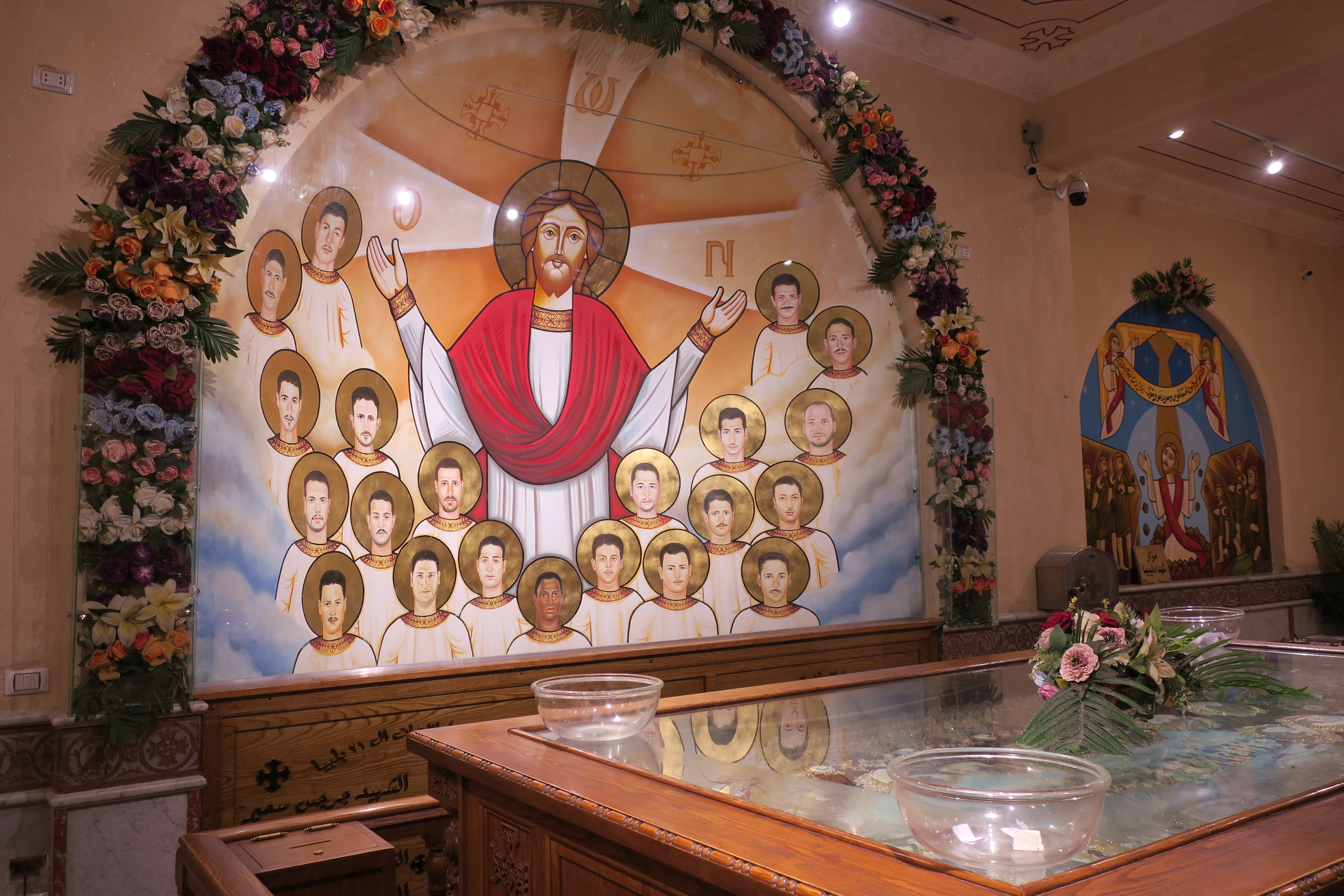
- Icon of the 21 Martyrs of Libya

Martyrs
- Born: Various; 20 from Egypt, one from Ghana
- Died: 15 February 2015; Southern Mediterranean Sea Coast, Sirte, Libya (murdered by the Islamic State)
- Cause of death: Decapitation
- Resting place: Village of Al-Our, Samalut, Minya, Egypt
- Venerated in: Oriental Orthodox Churches; Catholic Church; Evangelical-Lutheran Churches; Anglican Communion
- Canonized: 21 February 2015, Village of Al-Our, Samalut, Minya Governorate, Egypt by Pope Tawadros II
- Major shrine: Church of the Martyrs of the Faith and Homeland, Samalut, Egypt
- Feast: 15 February (Gregorian calendar); 8 Meshir (Coptic calendar)
- Attributes: Crown of martyrdom; Orange jumpsuits; Martyr's palm; Crucifix
- Patronage: Egypt; Libya; Ghana; Migrant workers; Persecuted Christians

The 21 Coptic Christian Martyrs of Libya are Christian construction workers who were killed for their Christian faith by the Islamic State (IS), and subsequently canonized as martyrs and saints by Pope Tawadros II. On 12 February 2015, the Islamic State released a video online showing photos of 21 Christian construction workers—twenty from Egypt and one from Ghana—that they had kidnapped in the city of Sirte, Libya, and who they reported had been killed for their faith in Jesus Christ. The men, who came from different villages in Egypt, 13 of them from Al-Our, Minya Governorate, were kidnapped in Sirte on 27 December 2014, and in January 2015. On February 15, 2015, the Islamic State's media wing published a video online titled "A Message Signed with Blood to the Nation of the Cross", in which the 21 captives were paraded on a beach before being beheaded. IS claimed that the executions were in retaliation for the alleged abduction of Kamilia Shehata. This was not the first time that Coptic Egyptians in Libya had been the subject of abuse for political reasons, a pattern that goes back to the 1950s. In late 2014, a militia group in eastern Libya declared its affiliation with IS and then took over parts of Derna. People allied to the group claimed responsibility for attacks across the country, including the Corinthia Hotel attack in January 2015. On 19 April 2015, IS released another video, which showed the murder of about 30 Ethiopian Christians, reflecting a systemic pattern of the persecution of Christians by the Islamic State.

The victims, all but one members of the Coptic Orthodox Church, were formally declared martyrs and saints in February 2015 by Pope Tawadros II of Alexandria. In 2016, the Lutheran Church – Missouri Synod, a confessional branch of Evangelical-Lutheranism, made a tribute to the 21 Coptic Christian Martyrs on their feast day. In 2023, Pope Francis announced that the 21 Christian men murdered by IS would also be commemorated by the Catholic Church and listed within the Roman Martyrology in what was described as a major ecumenical decision. The martyrs are commemorated on 15 February (civil calendar) in these Christian denominations. A film titled The 21 was released in 2024 to commemorate them.

== Execution ==
On 15 February 2015, a five-minute video was published by Al-Hayat, an IS multi-language media wing, showing the beheading of the captives on a beach along the southern Mediterranean coast. A caption in the video called the captives the "People of the cross, followers of the hostile Egyptian Church." In the video, the leader was dressed in camouflage, while the other terrorists were dressed in black. The victims were all dressed in orange jumpsuits, as in many previous IS videos. The leader Abu Nabil al-Anbari declared in English:

All praises due to Allah, the strong and mighty, and may blessings and peace be upon the one sent by the sword, as a mercy to all the worlds [Muhammad]. O people, recently you've seen us on the hills of Al-Sham [Greater Syria] and on Dabiq's Plain, chopping off the heads that had been carrying the cross delusion for a long time, filled with spite against Islam and Muslims, and today we're on the south of Rome, on the land of Islam, Libya, sending another message: O crusaders, safety for you will be only wishes. Especially when you're fighting us all together, therefore, we will fight you all together, until the war lays down its burdens and Jesus, peace be upon him, will descend, breaking the cross, killing the swine, and abolishing the Jizya. And the sea you've hidden Sheikh Osama bin Laden's body in, we swear to Allah, we will mix it with your blood.

In the moments before the beheadings (3'25" to 3'32" of the video) an edited audio clip records a number of them crying out "Ya Rabb Yesua!" (Note: Arabic: يا رب يسوع, lit. 'O Lord Jesus!') and the caption reads: (Arabic: يذكرون معبودهم ويموتون على شركهم, lit. 'They supplicate what they worship and die upon their paganism'), suggesting that they had been given a chance to convert to Islam but refused it: For this reason, the Coptic Church proclaimed them martyrs. During the beheading of the captives (3'32" to 3'40" of the video), a part of an IS acappella chant, "Qariba… Qariba" (Note: Arabic: قريبا..قريبا, lit. 'Soon… Soon') was playing in the background of the video, with an edited audio clip of the captives yelling in agony. After beheading the captives (3'40" to 4'15" of the video), the a cappella chant continued to play and a message appears on the screen: (Arabic: هذه الدماء النجسة بعض ما ينتظركم، ثأرا ل (كاميليا) وأخواتها, lit. 'This filthy blood is just some of what awaits you, in revenge for Kamilia and her sisters.') This was referencing Kamilia Shehata, a Coptic Egyptian woman and wife of a Coptic priest, who Islamists believe had converted to Islam and was detained by the Coptic Church because of it; she later denied the claim. In the final part of the video (4'15" to 5'01" of the video), the speaker declares, "and we will conquer Rome, by Allah's permission, the promise of our Prophet, peace be upon him," pointing his knife toward the sea, while the captives' blood pooled into the Mediterranean coast.

The Coptic Church, the Egyptian government, and the Libyan parliament confirmed the deaths.

Several experts speculated that the video had been digitally manipulated in various ways and that the actual murders were likely filmed in front of a green screen and then superimposed onto the footage of the beach. However, when one of the perpetrators was arrested, he told investigators that the slaughter had indeed taken place at the beach opposite Al Mahary Hotel in Sirte.

== Aftermath ==
The president of Egypt Abdel Fattah el-Sisi announced a seven-day period of national mourning and called for an urgent meeting with the country's top security body. In a televised address, el-Sisi declared his country reserved the right to retaliate. He also reiterated an offer to facilitate Egyptians' evacuation from Libya and imposed a travel ban on citizens to Libya. Officials from Al-Azhar, a prominent mosque and learning center in Egypt, also condemned the incident. The killings were also addressed particularly by the United Nations Security Council, French President François Hollande and U.S. Secretary of State John Kerry. Pope Francis telephoned Pope Tawadros II to offer his condolences. At an ecumenical meeting with the Moderator of the General Assembly of the Church of Scotland, Pope Francis stated "They only said 'Jesus help me ...' The blood of our Christian brothers is testimony that cries out. Be they Catholic, Orthodox, Copts, Lutherans, it doesn't matter: They're Christian!" The Ministry of Foreign Affairs and Trade of Hungary provided €500 of financial support for each of the victims' families. Péter Szijjártó said "Hungary cannot be a bystander of the continuous attacks against Christian communities in the Middle East." The Obama administration was criticized for referring to the victims simply as Egyptian citizens rather than Christians, the express reason for their murder.

At dawn on 16 February, the Egyptian military conducted airstrikes on IS facilities in Libya. The airstrikes targeted IS training locations and weapons stockpiles. All military aircraft returned safely to base. The Libyan Air Force also conducted strikes in Derna, occupied by an IS affiliate since 2014. No militants were killed and 7 civilians were reportedly killed.

The lives of the martyrs have been detailed in a book by Martin Mosebach called The 21 – A Journey into the Land of Coptic Martyrs. An independent short film, The 21, has been produced by a team of more than 70 artists from 24+ countries to honor the 21 martyrs and debuted for a global audience on February 15, 2025 - the 10th anniversary of their death. The 21, the Power of Faith: the Village of Martyrs, a French documentary by Samuel Armnius was broadcast on KTO and screened at the Vatican Film Library on 15 February 2024.

== Veneration ==
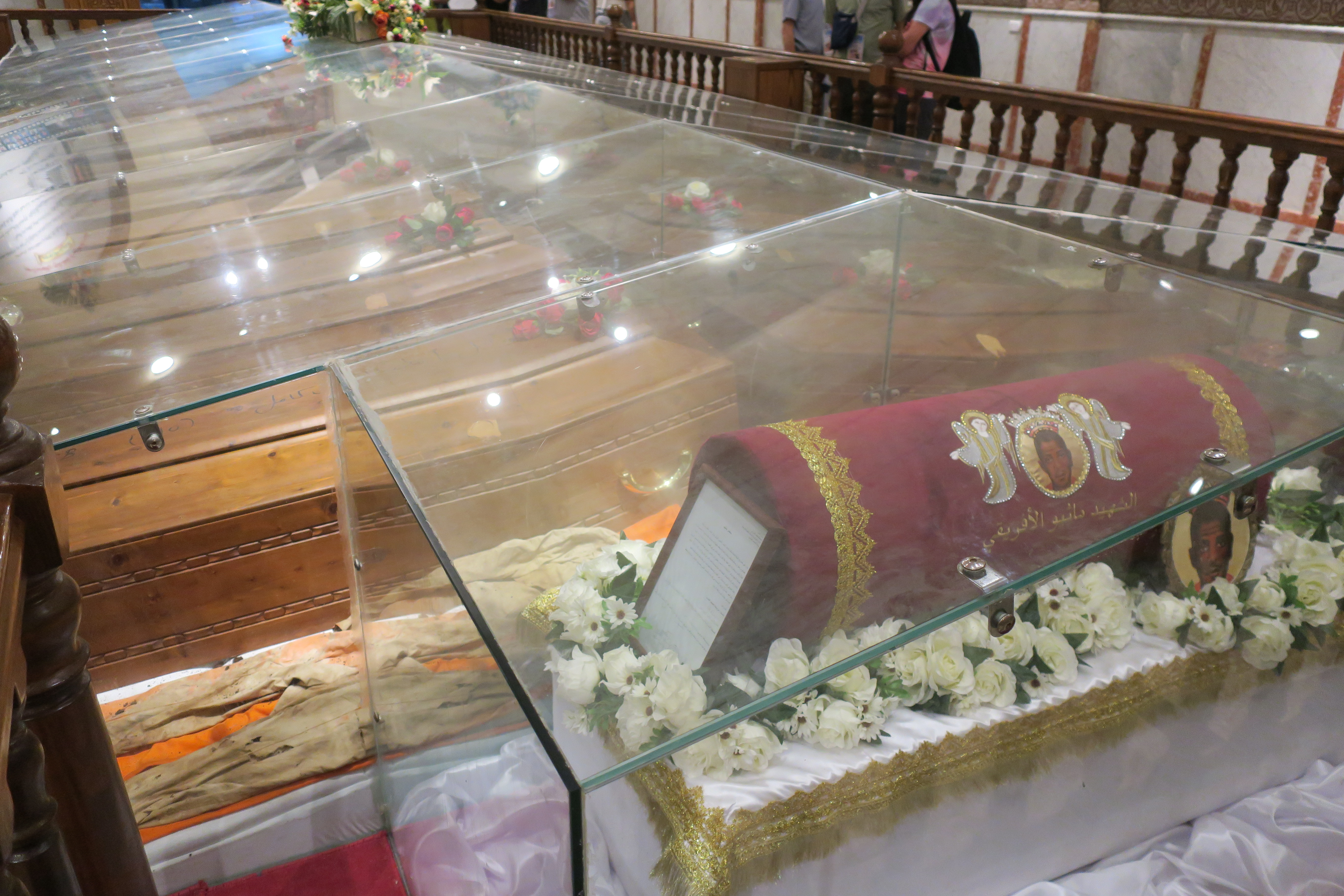
Relics of the Coptic Libyan Martyrs in Church of Martyrs of the Faith and Homeland, Village of Al-Our, Minya governorate

On 21 February 2015, seven days after their death, Pope Tawadros II of Alexandria canonized the 21 Coptic martyrs as saints. On 11 May 2023, Pope Francis met with Pope Tawadros II during general audiences to celebrate the 50th anniversary of the Coptic Orthodox-Catholic agreement at Saint Peter's Basilica in Rome. In his speech, Francis announced that he intended to add the 21 martyrs to the Roman Martyrology. He said "these martyrs were baptized not only in water and the Spirit, but also in blood, with a blood that is a seed of unity for all followers of Christ. I am pleased to announce today that, with Your Holiness' consent, these 21 martyrs will be included in the Roman Martyrology as a sign of the spiritual communion uniting our two Churches".

During the audience, Tawadros II gave Francis relics with a small statue of the 21 martyrs and an egg-shaped Coptic icon of the Holy Family. Upon receiving the relics, Francis said "I will try to make an altar in one of our basilicas in honor of the martyrs."

On 15 February 2024, an ecumenical prayer service was held at the Choir Chapel of Saint Peter's Basilica to celebrate the first commemoration of the 21 Coptic Martyrs of Libya in the Catholic Church. Cardinal Kurt Koch, prefect of the Dicastery for Promoting Christian Unity, presided at the service and preached the homily. The relics of the martyrs, given to Pope Francis by Pope Tawadros II, were placed on the altar for veneration. Afterwards, the documentary, The 21: The Power of Faith, was screened at the Vatican Film Library.

On 12 July 2026, the Church of England's general synod announced they would add the Martyrs to their liturgical calendar.

They are venerated as saints and martyrs in the Oriental Orthodox Churches, the Church of England, the Lutheran churches and the Catholic Church, and their feast day is celebrated every year on 15 February of the Gregorian calendar. The commemoration falls on the feast of the Presentation of Jesus at the Temple which is 8 Amshir of the Coptic calendar; however, during a leap year, 8 Amshir corresponds with 16 February.

== 21st martyr ==
After the beheadings, the Coptic Orthodox Church released the martyrs' names, but there were only 20 names. In the video, the 21st victim was of Black African descent, in contrast to the others, who were ethnic Copts. It was later learned that the 21st victim was named Matthew Ayariga and that he was from Ghana. It is most likely that he was already a Christian, because sources reported that he said "I am a Christian and I am like them". In October 2020, Christian News Now reported that "Ayariga was a Christian migrant worker from Ghana". In the book The 21: A Journey into the Land of Coptic Martyrs, Martin Mosebach, who traveled to Egypt to meet the families of the martyrs, also states that Ayariga said "I am a Christian". However, according to some unnamed sources, he was not originally a Christian, but saw the immense faith of the others, and when the terrorists asked him if he rejected Jesus he reportedly said, "Their God is my God", knowing that he would be killed for saying this. Ayariga's conversion has been compared to the conversion of Saint Aglaius, one of the 40 Martyrs of Sebaste.

When the remains of the 21 bodies were found, the bodies of the 20 Egyptians were returned into Egypt. On 29 September 2020, Ayariga's remains were received in Egypt by the new church in Al-Our, the Church of the Martyrs of Faith and Homeland, a shrine built in honor of the martyrs. The family members of the other martyrs "expressed their joy at the return of the remains of the martyr [Matthew Ayariga]", saying "Our joy is complete." Majid Shehata, a daughter of one of the martyrs, said, "It was a surprise to all of us that we see the remains of the martyr Matthew inside the Church of the Martyrs, and this is a long-awaited news and all the families are in great joy and we thank God for having responded to us in the return of the martyr."

== Return of the remains ==
After the expulsion of the IS fighters from Sirte, government authorities announced they had found the place where the bodies of the martyrs were buried. This was done after the government authorities and the Libyan army arrested one of the terrorists who was present during the slaughter. The Libyan Attorney General ordered cooperation with the Egyptian authorities to send DNA samples from the families of the martyrs to be compared with DNA samples from the remains.

Later, it was ascertained that the remains belonged to the martyrs after comparing the families' DNA samples sent by the Egyptian Forensic Medicine Authority with the DNA samples taken from the remains by the Libyan Forensic Medicine Commission.

On 15 May 2018, the remains of the 20 Egyptians were returned to the Church of Martyrs of the Faith and Homeland, which was built for and named after them in Martyrs' Village (formerly Al-Aour, Al-Awar, or Al-Our; Egyptian Arabic: قرية العور), Minya governorate. A special shrine was built in which the remains were laid so that people can visit them. Churches and monasteries' bells were rung all over Egypt when the remains arrived at Cairo International Airport from Misrata Airport in Libya; celebrations of the return of the remains to their homeland. They were received by Pope Tawadros II, a large number of priests, Ambassador Nabila Makram, the Egyptian minister of immigration and Egyptians affairs abroad, and other state officials at the airport. A Mass was held, presided over by Bishop of Samalut Anba Baphnotius.

One year later, on 25 July 2019, the Coptic Church officially requested the Libyan Embassy in Cairo ship Ayariga's body to Egypt. Anba Pavnotios dispatched an official delegation to meet Chargé d'affaires of the Libyan Embassy, Fawzy al-Mabrouk Tantoush.

The delegation included the priests of the Cathedral of the Martyrs of the Faith and Homeland in Al-Our, Friars Marcos Atef and Epiphanius Yunan, Nevine Ragy, General Manager of Schools and Projects of the Coptic Orthodox Diocese of Samalut, and Nader Shukry, Member of the board on the Church of the Martyrs of the Faith and Homeland, and coordinator of crisis management for the martyrs' families. The Libyan Embassy's social attaché Hussein Al-Bashir Shafsha also attended the meeting.

The Egyptian delegation handed Tantoush a letter from Anba Pavnotios requesting that the body of Ayariga be brought to Egypt "to be joined with his Coptic brothers in their final resting place". The Metropolitan said the Church would give all the necessary legal pledges and guarantees to honour the rights of all parties should his country ask to have him back.

In 2019, the Libyan government agreed to transfer Ayariga's body to Egypt. His remains were transferred to Egypt and laid to rest with the other martyrs at the end of September 2020.

== Names of the Christian martyrs ==
The following is the list of the Christian martyrs:

- Gerges Samir Megally
- Samuel Alhoam Wilson
- Hany Abdel-Masih Salib
- Melad Mackeen Zaki
- Abanoub Ayad Attia
- Ezzat Bushra Nassif
- Yousef Shokry Younan
- Kirillos Shukry Fawzy
- Majed Suleiman Shehata
- Samuel Stéphanos Kamel
- Malak Ibrahim Siniot
- Bishoy Stéphanos Kamel
- Mena Fayez Aziz
- Girgis Melad Sniout
- Tawadros Youssef Tawadros
- Essam Badr Samir
- Luke Ngati
- Jaber Mounir Adly
- Malak Faraj Abram
- Sameh Salah Farouk
- Matthew Ayariga

== See also ==
- The 21
- Persecution of Copts
- Persecution of Christians in the post–Cold War era
- Copts in Libya
- List of Catholic saints
- List of Christian human rights NGOs
- List of venerated persons from Africa
- List of Coptic saints
- Islamic State beheading incidents
- Christian martyr
- New Martyr
