= El Idwa =

El Idwa العدوة
- Town
- Location in Egypt
- Coordinates: 28°42′N 30°45′E
- Country: Egypt
- Governorate: Minya

Area
  - Total: 8.49 km^{2} (3.28 sq mi)
- Elevation: 32 m (105 ft)

Population (2023)
  - Total: 27,418
  - Density: 3,230/km^{2} (8,360/sq mi)
- Time zone: UTC+2 (EET)
  - Summer (DST): UTC+3 (EEST)

El Idwa (Arabic: العدوة) is a town in the Minya Governorate of Egypt. It is located on the west bank of the Nile.

== See also ==
- List of cities and towns in Egypt
