= Samuel of Dabra Wagag =

Middle Ages Ethiopian saint

- Born: 1350

Abba Samuel (Ge'ez: አባ ሳሙኤል), or commonly called Samuel of Dabra Wagag (Ge'ez: ሳሙኤል ዘደብረ ወገግ), was an Ethiopian saint living in the latter half of the 14th and the first decades of the 15th century. The source for his life is his hagiography, most accessible in Stanislas Kur's French translation of the Ge'ez original, Actes de Samuel de Dabra Wagag. The original work (Ge'ez: ገድለ ሳሙኤል ዘወገግ Gadla Sāmū'ēl za-Wagag) survives only in two 20th-century manuscripts, both copies of a 16th-century revision of an earlier composition. He founded the monastery Debra Wagag.

== Early life and education ==
Abba Samuel was born in 1350. Like the parents of many other saints, and reminiscent of the story of Hannah and Elkanah in the opening chapters of the Books of Samuel, Abba Samuel's parents, Andreyas ("Andrew") and Arsonwa, longed for a child, but were almost too old to beget one. After a visit of the saint Tekle Haymanot (a chronological impossibility as Tekle Haymanot had died before Samuel's birth) to the aging couple, Arsonwa became pregnant and gave birth to a son, with the help of a midwife. The child was said to be born with the Holy Communion in his right hand. The saint baptised the child and called him Samuel.

When Samuel was seven (or six) years of age, he was considered old enough to learn, leaving home to live in a monastery with Tekle Haymanot, his teacher and spiritual father. Samuel, as usual in spiritual education in Ethiopia, was ordained deacon, and later priest. Still later, after having become a monk, he left his teacher Tekle Haymanot to live a life of his own. Samuel was sent to the region of Yagmu which he renamed Wagag, "Dawn". There he built his first church, called Hagere Maskal, "Community of the Cross".

== Fate of Andreyas, Samuel's father ==
In Samuel's father's time, Emperor Amda Seyon I of Ethiopia had had the adherents of Tekle Haymanot deported, because they denounced the king's marriage with a concubine of his father. Andreyas was chased away to Krestos Fatar. After a fruitful life as a monk in Krestos Fatar he was called to the king a second time. This time, he was tortured together with his fellow-believers, and afterwards exiled. He died on the road and was buried in Enasedestey.

When the Ethiopian Emperor Dawit I of Ethiopia ascended the throne in 1382, things changed, as the new Emperor was more pious and favorable to the monk. Samuel had the opportunity to visit the grave of his father in Enasedestey, where he built a church, in which he reburied the bones of his father, at the foot of the Tabot.

== First miracle ==
A baker of Emperor Dawit I came to beg for the help of Abba Samuel, because he had burnt the king's bread in baking it. Samuel reassured the man and urged him to have faith. As soon as the king noticed the burned bread, he became angry and ordered the poor baker whipped. As the whip was about to land on the baker's back, it broke in half. The royal executioner tried to hit him a second time with the remnant of the whip, but it split in half again. And so forth. When Dawit learnt that the baker was protected by Samuel, he was pacified and showed mercy.

== Arsonwa, Samuel's mother ==
Dawit appointed Abba Samuel as patriarch over the territory of Endagabton. On his way to his new duty, Samuel visited his homeland Zem, to visit his mother. She had become an old lady. Samuel brought her into the monastery of Wagag, where she spent the rest of her life as a nun. She died on the 6th of the month of Säne in an unknown year, and was buried in Wagag. Samuel mourned by her grave for forty days and forty nights, and then purified himself in the Setal River.

When he dove into the water, he uncovered the snares of a demon named Qwetel in the form of a 40-metre (130 ft) piece of rope. Samuel brought it up on to dry land and repaired the roof of his church with it.

== Church building ==
After building Hagere Maskal in the territory of Wagag, Samuel built further churches everywhere he travelled. He called the people to the Orthodox faith, mostly after having chased away the locally operating demons or dask. He asked the people to give him land to build them churches and monasteries, and also asked for building materials. The Actes attributes at least ten churches and monasteries to him, and says he appointed numerous fellow believers as priests and leaders of the new communities.

Many church building stories show the recurrent pattern of a demon or a pack of them dominating a territory, victory over the demons by Abba Samuel, baptism and conversion to the orthodox faith of the inhabitants and finally the building of a church.

There are some remarkable stories in which trees play a role as focus of veneration for the non-Christianised people and as a hiding place for demons. They all show the recurring motifs of a tree inhabited by the pagan spirit Dask (or Desk), the fear of the people to cut this tree and the tree nearly fatally falling over them when it is felt. But by driving out the spirits, defeating the demons and by cutting the trees, Abba Samuel acquired the wood needed for the construction of doors, portals and roofs for his churches.

=== The daero tree ===
One of these stories is, in brief:

There was a great tree in the land of Zem, a daero tree. This tree bled like a woman once a month, and a serpent is lurked in its branches. Abba Samuel came to Zem to drive out the serpent and fell the tree. He succeeded in cutting the tree after having signed his face by the cross and after having set his axe to the stem in the name of the Holy Trinity. A poisonous dragon escaped from the tree. Its poison was neutralised by the prayers of Samuel, and after having received 81 blows from the public, it died. At the end of the story, Samuel baptises the people, teaches them te orthodox faith and starts the construction of the church of Zem in the name of Our Lady Mary.

== Death ==
Abba Samuel died on Ethiopian calendar the 29th of the month Teqemt in Yazarzar, where he was buried. The year of his death is not mentioned. Seven months later, on the 27th of Genbot, his disciple Samra Krestos had his remains taken to Wagag and reburied him there.
