= Samalut =

Samalut سمالوط ⲧⲥⲉⲙⲟⲩⲗⲟⲧ
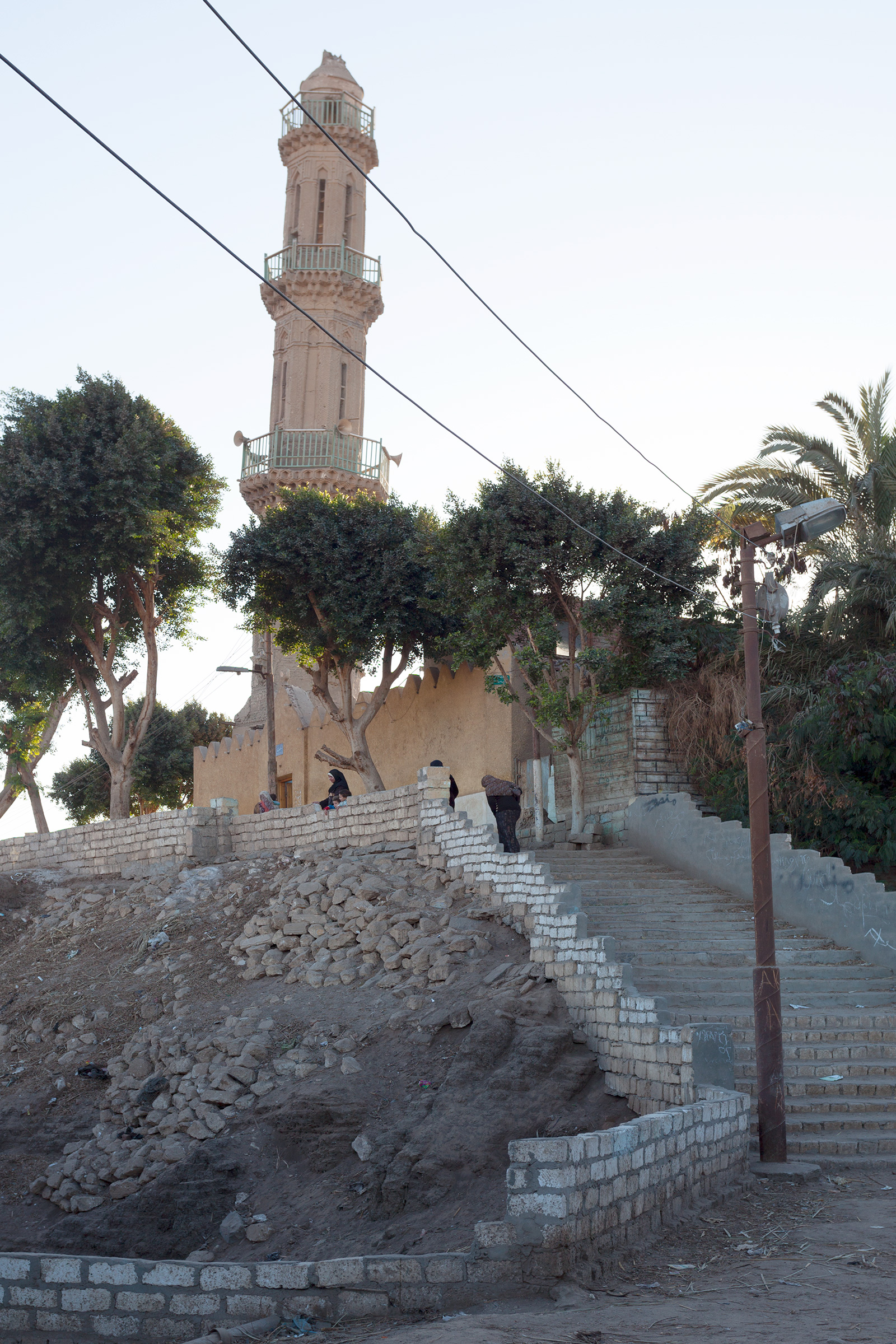

- Location in Egypt
- Coordinates: 28°18′35″N 30°42′39″E
- Country: Egypt
- Governorate: Minya

Area
  - Total: 64.5 sq mi (167.0 km^{2})

Population (2021)
  - Total: 347,427
  - Density: 5,388/sq mi (2,080/km^{2})
- Time zone: UTC+2 (EET)
  - Summer (DST): UTC+3 (EEST)

Samalut (Arabic: سمالوط, from Coptic: ⲧⲥⲉⲙⲟⲩⲗⲟⲧ t-Semulot) is a city and capital of the eponymous markaz (county) in the Upper Egyptian governorate of Minya. The markaz comprises nine main villages, and 54 subsidiary villages and hamlets, and is located on the west bank of the Nile, 225 km south of Cairo.

The earliest known reference to the city of Samalut can be found in a Coptic funerary inscription that possibly dates back to the 5th century AD.

== Religion ==
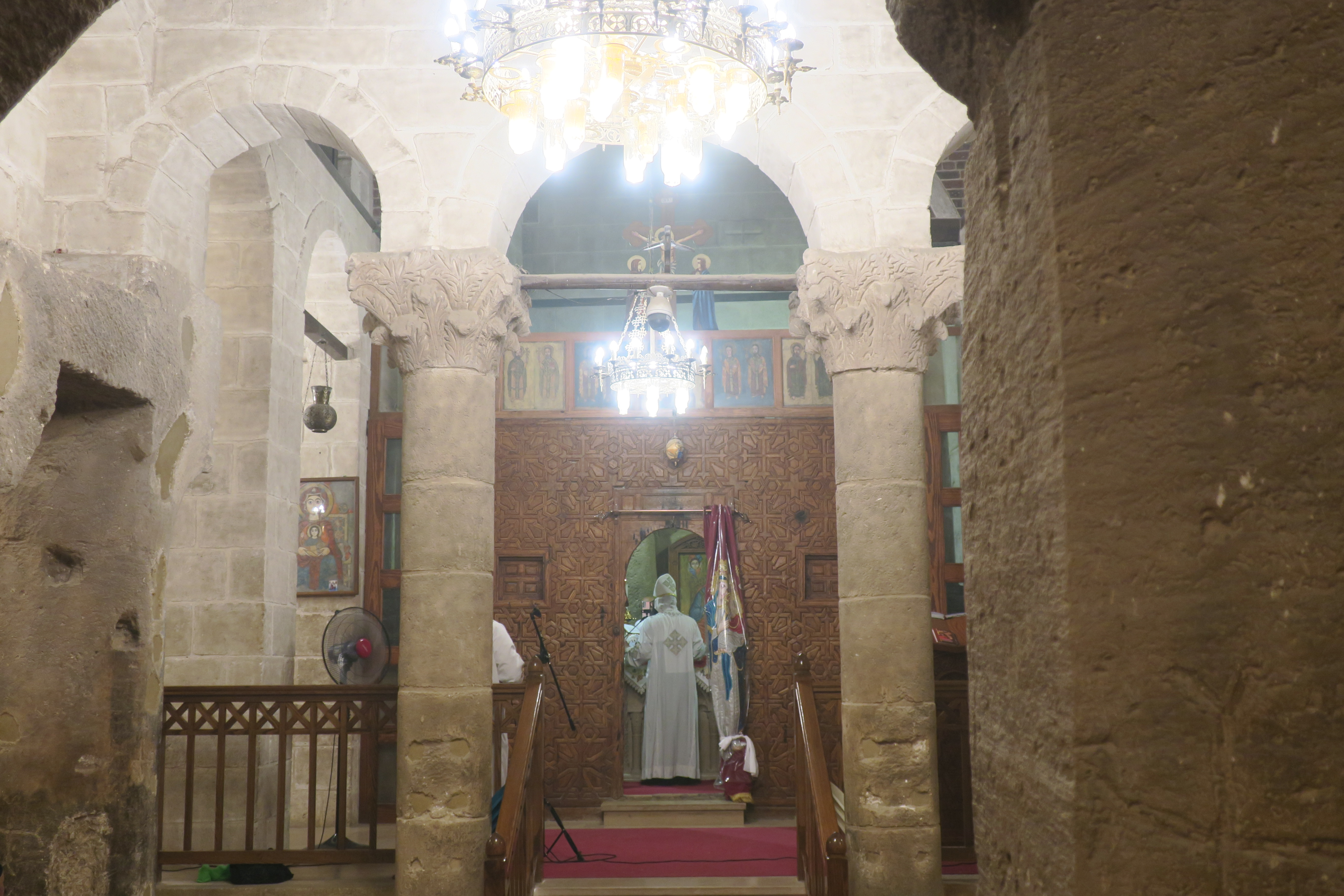
Church of the Blessed Virgin Mary of Gabal el Teir

Near Samalut is the Coptic Orthodox Monastery of the Virgin Mary at Gebel el-Teir, an important Christian pilgrimage site. Samalut's church was built by Empress Helena, mother of Constantine the Great, in AD 328, on one of the sites where the Holy Family is believed to have stayed during their flight into Egypt.

Also near Samalut is the village of Al Our, where the Martyrs of Faith and Homeland Church commemorates the 21 Coptic Martyrs of Libya, serving both as their shrine and final resting place.

== Climate ==
Samalut has an arid desert climate (Köppen: BWh).

Climate data for Samalut
Month	Jan	Feb	Mar	Apr	May	Jun	Jul	Aug	Sep	Oct	Nov	Dec	Year
Mean daily maximum °C (°F)	19.8 (67.6)	21.7 (71.1)	25.5 (77.9)	29.9 (85.8)	34.0 (93.2)	36.3 (97.3)	37.1 (98.8)	37.0 (98.6)	35.0 (95.0)	31.1 (88.0)	26.3 (79.3)	21.7 (71.1)	29.6 (85.3)
Daily mean °C (°F)	13.4 (56.1)	15.1 (59.2)	18.8 (65.8)	22.9 (73.2)	27.3 (81.1)	30.1 (86.2)	31.0 (87.8)	31.1 (88.0)	29.1 (84.4)	25.2 (77.4)	19.9 (67.8)	15.3 (59.5)	23.3 (73.9)
Mean daily minimum °C (°F)	8.0 (46.4)	9.3 (48.7)	12.4 (54.3)	16.0 (60.8)	20.3 (68.5)	23.2 (73.8)	24.7 (76.5)	25.1 (77.2)	23.4 (74.1)	19.9 (67.8)	14.6 (58.3)	10.2 (50.4)	17.3 (63.1)
Average precipitation mm (inches)	1.4 (0.06)	1.1 (0.04)	1.6 (0.06)	0.0 (0.0)	0.0 (0.0)	0.0 (0.0)	0.0 (0.0)	0.0 (0.0)	0.0 (0.0)	0.1 (0.00)	0.3 (0.01)	0.8 (0.03)	5.3 (0.2)
Source: Weather.Directory

== See also ==
- Holy Family in Egypt
