= Dir Mawas =

Deir Mawas دير مواس
- Location within Egypt
- Coordinates: 27°38′N 30°51′E
- Country: Egypt
- Governorate: Minya Governorate

Area
  - Total: 233.2 km^{2} (90.0 sq mi)
- Elevation: 50 m (160 ft)

Population (2023)
  - Total: 470,766
- Time zone: UTC+2 (EET)
  - Summer (DST): UTC+3 (EEST)

Deir Mawas (Arabic: دير مواس, literally 'monastery of razors') is a city in Minya Governorate, Upper Egypt, on the west bank of the Nile. It is the administrative seat of the Deir Mawas markaz (district). The city had a population of 470,766 as of 2023. It lies about 300 kilometres south of Cairo and is known primarily as the nearest city to Tell el-Amarna, the site of the ancient Egyptian capital built by Akhenaten.

== Name ==
The name Deir Mawas translates literally as 'monastery of razors' in Arabic. It is thought to derive from the name of an ancient monastery that once existed in the area but has since disappeared. The city is sometimes transliterated in English sources as Deir Muwas or Dir Mawas.

== Geography ==
Deir Mawas sits on the west bank of the Nile at an elevation of about 50 metres above sea level, at coordinates 27°38′N 30°51′E. The city covers a total area of 233.2 square kilometres. The village of Delga lies about 16 kilometres to the south-west of the city, near the border with Asyut Governorate.

== History ==
=== Ancient period ===
The district of Deir Mawas contains one of the most significant archaeological sites in Egypt: Tell el-Amarna, the ruins of the ancient city of Akhetaten. The city was built around 1348 BCE by Pharaoh Akhenaten as the new capital of Egypt, dedicated to the worship of the sun-disk Aten. The site is named after the Beni Amran tribe who lived in the area when it was first recorded by Western scholars.

The city was abandoned shortly after Akhenaten's death around 1332 BCE and was later systematically dismantled by later pharaohs. The modern villages of el-Till and el-Hagg Qandil, both within the Deir Mawas district, now stand on parts of its ruins. The site contains royal tombs, the remains of the Great Temple of Aten, and the house of the sculptor Thutmose, where the famous bust of Nefertiti was found in 1912.

The Egypt Exploration Society excavated at Tell el-Amarna between 1921 and 1936, working with local support from communities in the Deir Mawas area including men and women from the villages of el-Till and el-Hagg Qandil. Local pottery traditions from Deir Mawas were the subject of a dedicated ethnoarchaeological study published in the Egypt Exploration Society's Amarna Reports series.

=== Christian history ===
The area around Deir Mawas has a long Christian history. The Diocese of Deir Mawas and Delga of the Coptic Orthodox Church was established in 1988. The diocese includes the 4th-century Monastery of the Virgin Mary and Anba Ibrahim in Delga, one of the oldest surviving ecclesiastical buildings in Upper Egypt.

In August 2013, following the dispersal of the Rabaa El-Adaweya sit-in, churches and Coptic-owned property in Deir Mawas and the nearby village of Delga were attacked. Human Rights Watch documented eyewitness accounts of the attacks, including the burning of the 4th-century church in Delga. The damaged buildings were later restored with state assistance.

== Administration ==
Deir Mawas is the seat of the Deir Mawas markaz, one of the administrative districts of Minya Governorate. The markaz includes the city itself and a number of surrounding villages and hamlets.

== Notable sites ==
- Tell el-Amarna – the ruins of the ancient capital Akhetaten, one of the most important archaeological sites in Egypt, located about 12 kilometres north-east of the city
- Saint George's Cathedral – the main church of the Diocese of Deir Mawas and Delga, rebuilt as a four-storey building in 2004
- Monastery of the Virgin Mary and Anba Ibrahim – a 4th-century monastery in the village of Delga, 16 kilometres south-west of the city

== See also ==
- Amarna
- Akhenaten
- Minya Governorate
