= George Willoughby Fraser =

English civil engineer

- Born: 5 August 1866 (baptized); Mereworth
- Died: 24 November 1923 (aged 57); Bath, Somerset
- Occupation(s): civil engineering, Egyptology
- Known for: Fraser Tombs
- Parent(s): Sir Thomas Fraser and Matilda Wildman

George Willoughby Fraser (baptized 5 August 1866 – 24 November 1923) was an English civil engineer who operated at the service of the Egypt Exploration Fund. His parents were Sir Thomas Fraser and Matilda Wildman.

As part of his work for the Egypt Exploration Fund, he worked as a draftsman in the excavations conducted by Sir Flinders Petrie, Percy Edward Newberry and Marcus Worsley Blackden in the Faiyum, in Beni Hasan, in Deir el-Bersha and in the quarries of Hatnub. Less well known is his description of the burial ground dating to the 4th and 5th dynasties, two kilometers south of Tuna el-Gebel, later renamed Fraser Tombs in his honor.

== Significant works ==
- "Mr. G. Willoughby Fraser's Report on the Survey of the Wady Dêr en-Nakhleh", in: Francis L. Griffith, Percy E. Newberry, El Bersheh Part 2. Egypt Exploration Fund u. a., London 1895, pp. 55–66.
- A catalogue of the scarabs belonging to George Fraser. London 1900.
- "The early tombs at Tehneh", in Annales du Service des Antiquités de l'Égypte 3, 1902, ISSN 1687-1510, pp. 67–76, 122–130, 5 plates.
