= Louis Awad =

Egyptian academic (1915–1990)

Louis Awad (Arabic: لويس عوض, el-Minya; 5 January 1915 – 9 September 1990) was an Egyptian intellectual and a writer.

Born to a Coptic Orthodox Christian family in the upper Egypt, in Sharuna village, in Minya, Egypt, Awad studied at the literature department of Cairo University before setting off to England for further studies before the Second World War. He returned to Egypt in 1941, after which he lived in the Cairo district of Dokki for much of his adult life.

He studied literature at Cairo University, Cambridge University, and Princeton University. In 1947 he was a professor of English at Cairo University and published a revolutionary collection of poems called Plotoland (also spelled Plutoland) wherein he introduced free verse forms to Egyptian literature and presented a scathing attack on traditionalism in poetry.

He was the first Egyptian chairman of the English Department (Faculty of Letters) at Cairo University and while there, he encouraged students to listen to classical music. When surrealism in art reached Egypt, he didn't denounce it but was quoted as saying, "“Whatever we think about the originality of this art form in Egypt, it was good at dealing a death blow to academism.”

From 1945 to 1950 he joined with other writers who drew from Marxism and other sources in a call for the total reform of Egyptian society. He attended talks by Taha Hussein with Denys Johnson-Davies. He was outspoken in his wish for "democratization and secularism in the Arab world" and he is celebrated in Egypt for having been a contemporary thinker.

Awad's unwavering critical stance continued after the 1952 revolution. As a consequence, he suffered the humiliation of being forced to resign his position at Cairo University in 1954. In 1976, he wrote about the revolution in The Seven Masks of Nasserism: Discussing Heikal and Tawfik Al-Hakim.

Awad became the literary editor at the newspaper al-Ahram-the largest daily newspaper of the Middle East making him one of the leading opinion-makers in the Arab world.

== See also ==
- List of Copts
- Lists of Egyptians
