= Akoris, Egypt =

Akoris
- Location in Egypt
- Coordinates: 28°11′16″N 30°46′21″E
- Country: Egypt
- Governorate: Minya
- Time zone: UTC+2 (EET)
  - Summer (DST): UTC+3 (EEST)

Akoris (Ancient Greek: Ἄκωρις or Ἀκορίς); Egyptian: Mer-nefer(et) (Old and Middle Kingdoms), Per-Imen-mat-khent(j) (New Kingdom), or Dehenet (since 26th Dynasty) is the Greek name for the modern Egyptian village of Ṭihnā al-Ǧabal (Arabic: طهنا الجبل, from Coptic: ⲧⲉϩⲛⲉ, lit. 'peak'), located about 12 km north of Al Minya. The ancient site is situated in the southeast of the modern village.

== Location ==
Akoris is located on the east bank of the Nile, at and below the limestone cliffs about 12 km north of Al Minya. The limestone cliffs at the east side of the place are divided here by a valley, the al-Wādī aṭ-Ṭihnāwī (Arabic الوادي الطهناوي). The southern rock looks like a lying lion. Anciently, it lay in the Cynopolite Nome, 17 miles (27 km) north of Antinoopolis.

== Names of the site ==
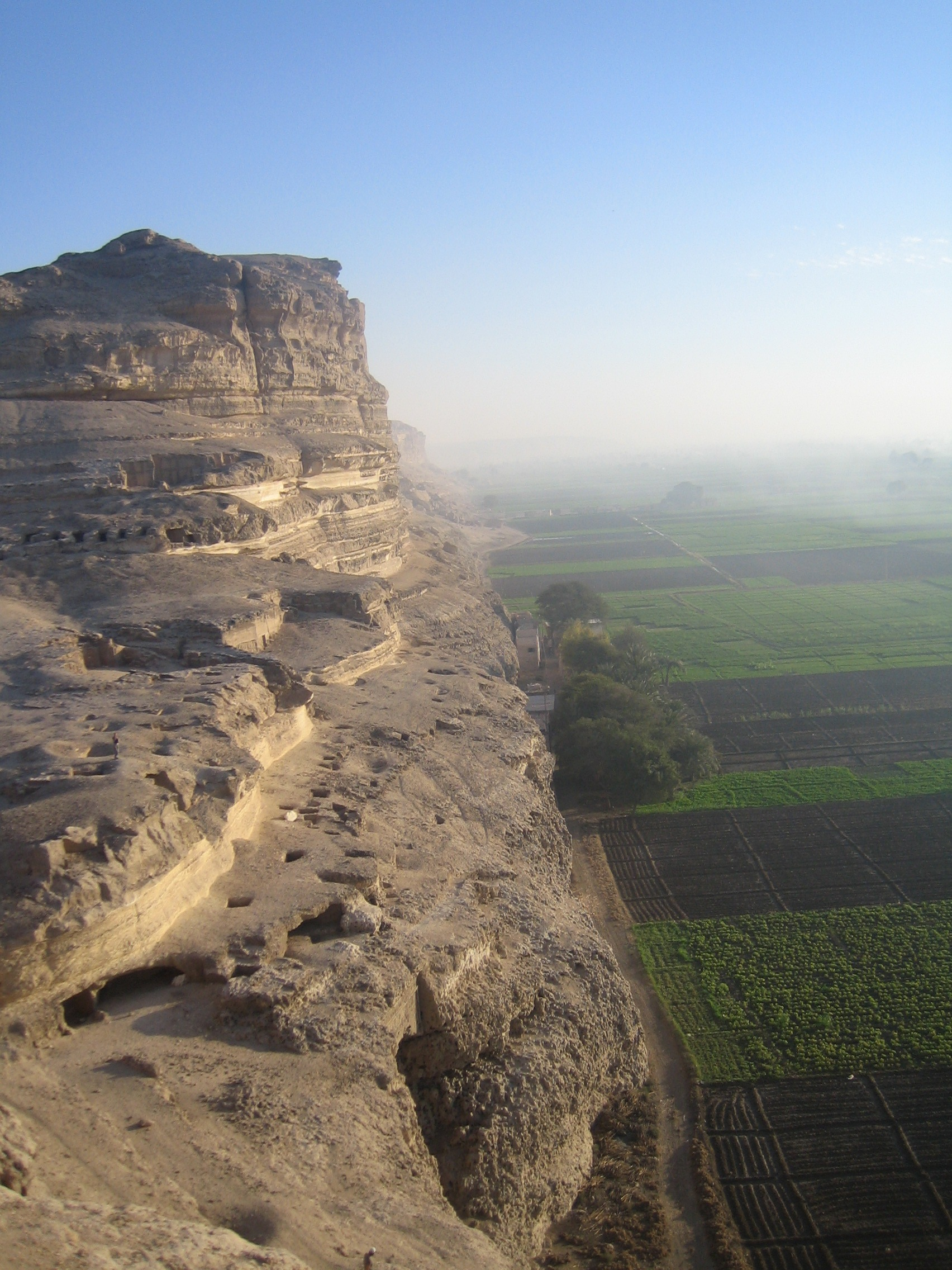
The peak of Tihna al-Gabal

The site was named with several names. In the Old and Middle Kingdoms Mer-nefer(et) (nice channel) was used. In the New Kingdom the site was named Per-Imen-m3t-khent(j) (The house of Amun the foremost lion). In the Late period (from 26th dynasty) it was named T3-dehenet (the cliff top).

In Greek times the names of Ἄκωρις (Akoris or in Latin Acoris) or Τῆνις (Tēnis) were given. The name of Akoris can be found in the third line of the rock stele of Ptolemy V Epiphanes at this site. Akoris is also mentioned by the geographer Ptolemy, and the town appears in the Tabula Peutingeriana.

The Arabic name Tihna (Arabic: طهنا) comes from Coptic: ⲧⲉϩⲛⲉ, lit. 'peak'.

== History ==
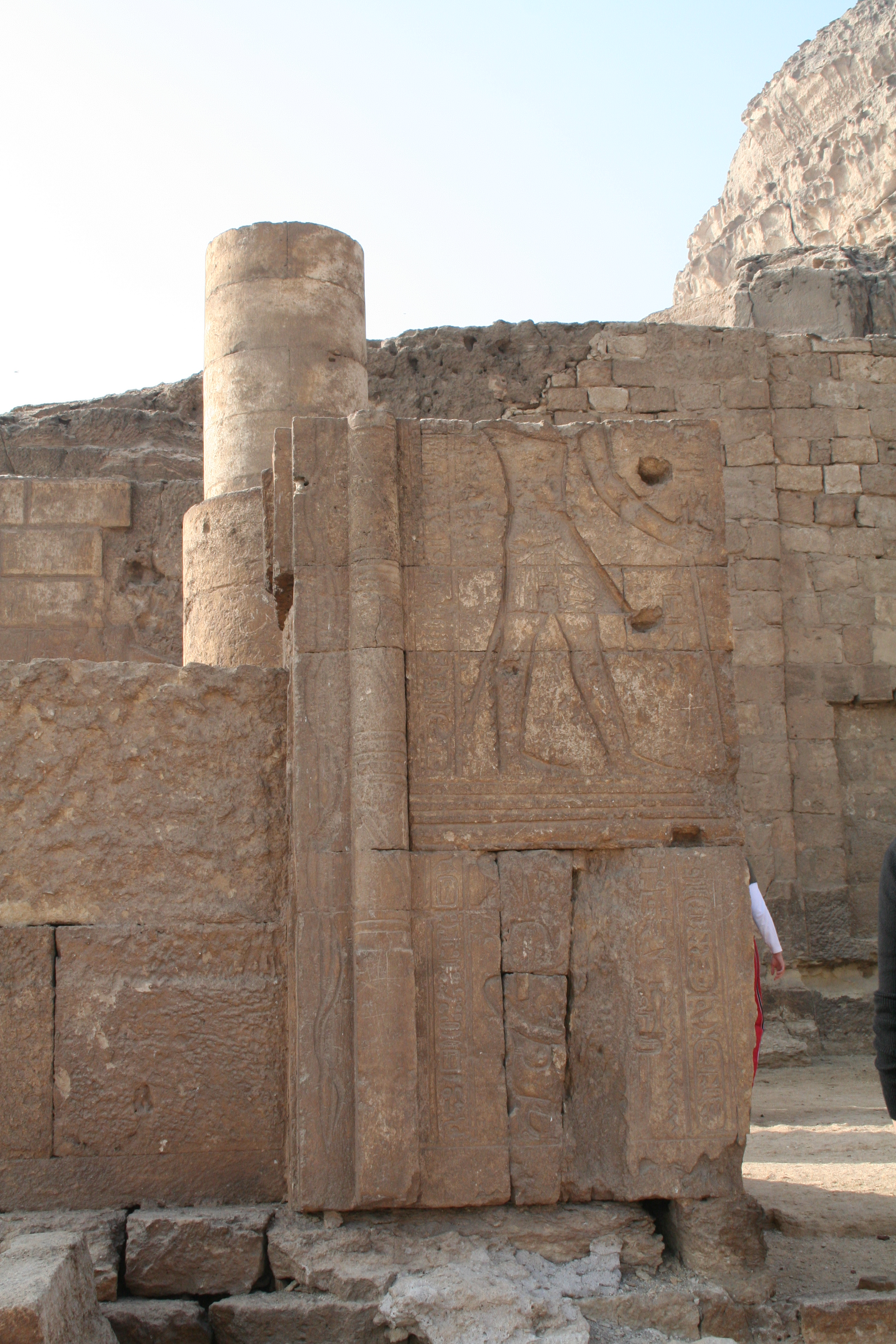
The Temple of Amun (Akoris)

The site was settled since the Old Kingdom. It was an important administrative town in the 17th upper-Egyptian nome in all ancient Egyptian times. It is the site of many rock-cut tombs, which belonged to officials of the Old Kingdom and the priests of the Late Period.

Archaeological remains came only from the New Kingdom and earlier times. In the New Kingdom the Temple of Amun was established in a former Old Kingdom tomb by Ramesses II and enlarged by Ramesses III. It is assumed that a fortress was established at this site in Persian times because of the strategic location of the town but no part of the fortress remains.

Akoris became an important town during the Greek and Roman periods, and its name was changed to Akoris. The today's settlement traces came from the Roman and Coptic times.

== Monuments ==
Akoris is home to several archaeological sites, including a number of rock-cut tombs from the Old Kingdom period, known as Fraser Tombs (about 2 km south of Akoris). Akoris comprises also two temples from early Egyptian history (New Kingdom until the Roman period), a rock chapel (called rock chapel C), a Greek funeral chapel (formerly called “Roman temple”), two rock stelae of Ramesses III, a rock stele of Ptolemy V Epiphanes, a stele of Diana and the Gemini twins Castor and Pollux and a necropolis from the Greek and Roman periods. These monuments are scattered for about 3 km along the desert and the limestone rocks.

== Gods ==
The gods are related to the site location and shape of the rocks. The earliest goddess of this site is maybe a lion goddess. From the Fraser Tombs the goddess Hathor, mistress of the valley entrance, is known (time of Menkaura, 4th Dynasty). Starting from the 18th Dynasty the god Amun the foremost lion is adored. The god Sobek, Lord of Behet (Lord of the mouth of the desert path), was added at the 26th Dynasty and became later the main god of the site. Other gods like Thoth, Isis and/or Mut, Osiris, Horus and Khonsu were adored from Greek-Roman times.

== Mining ==
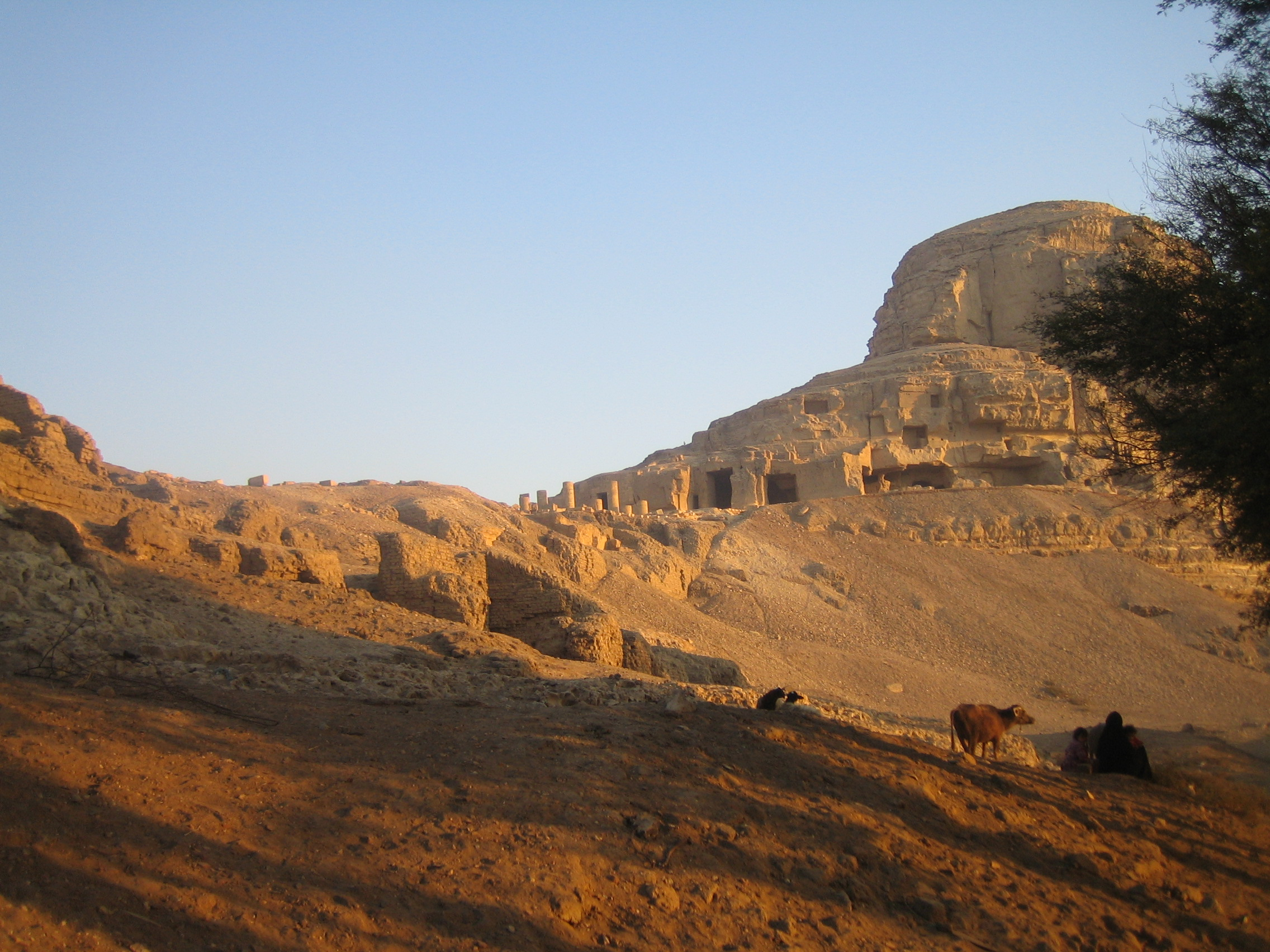

Like similar sites in the north and south of Akoris, this site was used as a limestone quarry in ancient times.

== Excavations ==
Records of the site were made during Napoleon's expedition to Egypt. A more comprehensive investigation was made by the German expedition conducted by Karl Richard Lepsius in the 1850s. At the beginning of the 20th century further investigations were made by Ahmed Kamal and Gustave Lefebvre. Since 1981 new comprehensive excavations have been carried out by a Japanese team under H. Kawanishi. They uncovered a fine but fragmentary Middle Kingdom model of a wooden boat. Since 2002, the team has investigated the southern part of the site and uncovered the TIP town.

The so-called Fraser Tombs were firstly discovered by the German Egyptologist Heinrich Brugsch in 1853 and firstly described by the British civil engineer George Willoughby Fraser half a century later.

== See also ==
- List of ancient Egyptian sites, including sites of temples
