= Beni Mazar =

Beni Mazar بَنِي مَزَار
- Nickname: Bani Zrar
- Location in Egypt, North Al-Minia city
- Coordinates: 28°30′N 30°48′E
- Country: Egypt
- Governorate: Minya

Area
  - Total: 122.3 sq mi (316.7 km^{2})

Population (2023)
  - Total: 731,649
  - Density: 5,983/sq mi (2,310/km^{2})
- Time zone: UTC+2 (EET)
  - Summer (DST): UTC+3 (EEST)

Beni Mazar (Arabic: بَنِي مَزَار) is a rural town in Egypt. It is located in the Minya Governorate, on the west bank of the Nile. The older name of the town is Shinwada (Arabic: شِنُوادة or شِنُوَدة) which comes from Sahidic Coptic: ϭⲓⲛⲟⲩⲟⲟⲧⲉ (Bohairic: ϣⲓⲛⲟⲩⲟϯ) meaning 'kailyard' (kitchen garden).

== See also ==
- List of cities and towns in Egypt
