= Minya Governorate =

Governorate of Egypt

- Governorate
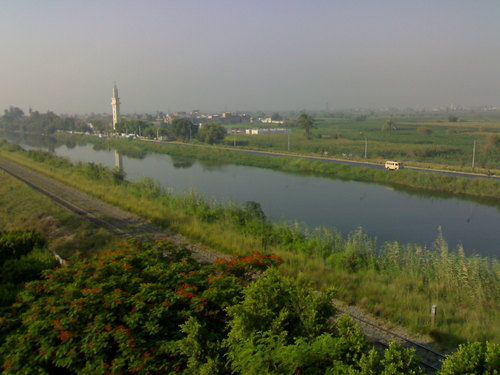

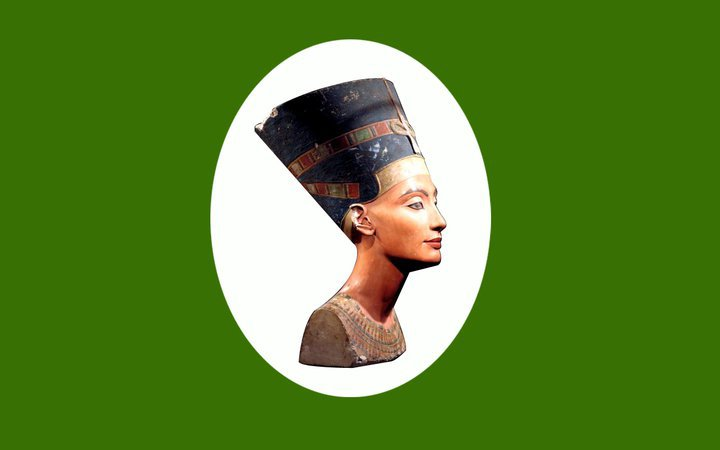
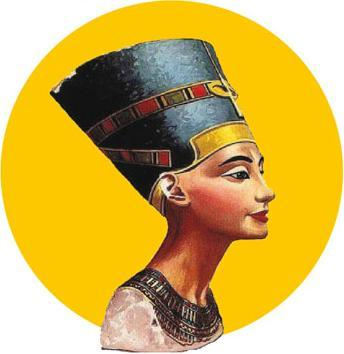
- Flag

- Minya Governorate on the map of Egypt
- Coordinates: 28.11°N 30.11°E
- Country: Egypt
- Seat: Minya (capital)

Government
  - Governor: Emad Kedwany

Area
  - Total: 32,279 km^{2} (12,463 sq mi)

Population (January 2024)
  - Total: 6,453,892
  - Density: 199.94/km^{2} (517.84/sq mi)

GDP
  - Total: EGP 131 billion (US$ 8.3 billion)
- Time zone: UTC+2 (EGY)
  - Summer (DST): UTC+3 (EEST)
- HDI (2021): 0.690 medium · 20th
- Website: www.minia.gov.eg

Minya (Arabic: محافظة المنيا Muḥāfẓet El Minya) is one of the governorates of Upper Egypt. Its capital city, Minya, is located on the left bank of the Nile River.

== Etymology ==
The name originates from the chief city of the governorate, originally known in Sahidic Coptic as Tmoone and in Bohairic as Thmonē, meaning “the residence”, in reference to a monastery formerly in the area. The name may also originate from the city's name in Egyptian Men'at Khufu.

== Overview ==
The rate of poverty is more than 60% in this governorate, where the total population is nearly 6 million. Recently the government has provided some assistance via social safety networks, specifically, some financial assistance to residents with disabilities, and job opportunities for them and others. The funding has been coordinated by the country's Ministry of Finance and with assistance from international organizations.

== Municipal divisions ==
The governorate is divided into municipal divisions with a total estimated population as of January 2024 of 6,453,892. In the case of Minya governorate, there are a number of aqsam and marakiz, and a new city. Sometimes a markaz and a kism share a name.

Municipal Divisions
| Anglicized name | Native name | Arabic transliteration | Population (January 2023 Est.) | Type |
|---|---|---|---|---|
| Abu Qirqas | مركز ابو قرقاص | Abū Qurqās | 684,612 | Markaz |
| El Idwa | مركز العدوة | Al-'Idwah | 281,729 | Markaz |
| Minya | مركز المنيا | Al-Minyā | 762,530 | Markaz |
| Minya 1 | قسم أول المنيا | Al-Minyā 1 | 56,487 | Kism (fully urban) |
| Minya 2 | قسم ثان المنيا | Al-Minyā 2 | 130,622 | Kism (fully urban) |
| Minya 3 | قسم ثالث المنيا | Al-Minyā 3 | 107,907 | Kism (fully urban) |
| Beni Mazar | مركز بنى مزار | Banī Mazār | 639,122 | Markaz |
| Deir Mawas | مركز دير مواس | Dayr Mawās | 466,443 | Markaz |
| New Minya | قسم المنيا الجديدة | Madīnat al-Minyā al-Jadīdah | 18,173 | Kism (fully urban) |
| Maghagha | مركز مغاغة | Maghāghah | 596,474 | Markaz |
| Mallawi | مركز ملوى | Mallawī | 839,418 | Markaz |
| Mallawi | قسم ملوى | Mallawī | 221,185 | Kism (fully urban) |
| Matai | مركز مطاى | Maṭāy | 364,183 | Markaz |
| Samalut East | مركز سمالوط شرق | Samālūṭ Sharq | 359,601 | Markaz |
| Samalut West | مركز سمالوط غرب | Samālūṭ Gharb | 547,908 | Markaz |

== Cities and towns ==
As of 2018, 10 cities (or towns) in Minya had a population of over 15,000 inhabitants.

Cities and towns with over 15,000 inhabitants
| English name | Native name | Arabic transliteration | Nov. 1996 Census | Nov. 2006 Census | Population (July 2017 Est.) |
|---|---|---|---|---|---|
| Abu Qirqas | أبو قرقاس | Abū Qurqās | 50,031 | 57,892 | 78,134 |
| El Idwa | العدوة | Al-'Idwah | 13,553 | 15,875 | 22,583 |
| Minya | المنيا | Al-Minyā | 201,440 | 236,043 | 245,478 |
| New Minya | المنيا الجديدة | Al-Minyā al-Jadīdah | 68 | 4,567 | 15,122 |
| Beni Mazar | بنى مزار | Banī Mazār | 52,690 | 79,553 | 100,201 |
| Deir Mawas | دير مواس | Dayr Mawās | 33,197 | 40,640 | 52,658 |
| Maghagha | مغاغة | Maghāghah | 60,405 | 75,657 | 102,328 |
| Mallawi | ملوى | Mallawī | 119,285 | 139,929 | 184,048 |
| Matai | مطاى | Maṭāy | 36,953 | 46,903 | 71,263 |
| Samalut | سمالوط | Samālūṭ | 75,437 | 91,475 | 122,919 |

== Population ==
According to population estimates from 2024 the majority of residents in the governorate live in rural areas, with an urbanization rate of only 18.9%. Out of an estimated 6,453,892 people residing in the governorate, 5,234,106 people live in rural areas as opposed to only 1,219,786 in urban areas.

== History ==
Minya Governorate contains numerous archaeological sites from several historical periods. Its history, including Ancient Egyptian, Hellenistic, Roman and Arab periods, has not yet received the full attention of scholars.

=== Ancient Egyptian period ===
Dehnet, Fraser Tombs, Sharuna, and Zawyet el-Maiyitin comprise monuments dating back to the Old Kingdom.

The village of Bani Hasan al Shurruq houses 390 rock-cut decorated tombs and chapels from the Middle Kingdom (2000–1580 BC, especially the sixteenth dynasty). The Speos Artemidos is nearby, and hosts temples built by Queen Hatshepsut.

Akhetaten was built by Pharaoh Akhenaten and dedicated to the god Aten. Akhenaten established the city as a center for the worship of Aten and resided there with his wife Nefertiti and their daughters, practicing and promoting the monotheistic religion associated with Aten. Remains of palaces, temples, and tombs from the period survive at the site.

Other significant archaeological sites in the governorate of Minya include Deir Abu Hinis, Deir el-Bersha, El-Sheikh Sa'id, and Tuna el-Gebel.

=== Greco-Roman period ===
El Ashmunein (Hermopolis Magna) was the capital of the region during this period. It was the main center of worship of the god Thoth. Today, the ruins of a Greek temple, similar to the Parthenon, can be still found.

The tomb and chapel of Petosiris are found near the modern village of Tuna el-Gebel.

Antinoöpolis was built in AD 130 by the Roman emperor Hadrian in memory of eromenos Antinous.

=== Byzantine period ===
The Monastery of the Virgin Mary at Gebel el-Teir is a Christian pilgrimage site near the city of Samalut. Its church was built by Empress Helena, mother of Constantine the Great, in 328, on one of the sites where the Holy Family is believed to have stayed during its Flight into Egypt.

Oxyrhynchus was an important administrative center during the Hellenistic Period, and remains an important archaeological source for papyri from the Byzantine Egypt.

=== Arab period ===
Maghagha hosts the mosque of the famous Muslim Zayid ibn al Mugharah.

=== Modern history ===
Today, Minya Governorate has the highest concentration of Coptic Christians of 50% of the total population. There are also a number of active monasteries in the region.

The 2016 Minya pogrom was a pogrom in a village in Minya Governorate, Egypt, by a Muslim mob against the Coptic community. The pogrom was instigated by a rumor that a Christian man and a Muslim woman were in a relationship. The mob ransacked and torched seven Christian homes. The mother of the Christian man was stripped naked and was paraded through the village to humiliate her.

In 2018, a Coptic cathedral was consecrated by Pope Tawadros II in the small village of Al Ur, near Samalut. The new cathedral was dedicated to the 21 Coptic Martyrs of Libya, thirteen of whom were from Al Ur.

=== Archaeology ===
In February 2019, fifty mummy collections wrapped in linen, stone coffins or wooden sarcophagi dated back to the Ptolemaic Kingdom were discovered by Egyptian archaeologists in the Tuna El-Gebel site. 12 of the graves in four burial chambers 9 m (30 ft) deep, belonged to children. One of the remains was the partly uncovered skull enclosed in linen.

In May 2020, Egyptian-Spanish archaeological mission headed by Esther Ponce revealed a unique cemetery consist of one room built with glazed limestone dating back to the 26th Dynasty (so-called the El-Sawi era) at the site of ancient Oxyrhynchus. Archaeologists also uncovered bronze coins, clay seals, Roman tombstones and small crosses.

In April 2026, an archaeological mission led by the University of Barcelona and the Institute of the Ancient Near East at the El-Bahnasa site, uncovered a significant Roman-era tomb complex that provides evidence of complex, syncretic funerary traditions. The excavation revealed a range of mortuary practices, including mummification with linen wraps and gold leaf, as well as the deposition of cremated remains within limestone chambers alongside animal offerings, such as a feline head. The recovery of ritual objects, specifically three golden and one copper tongue, suggests a practice intended to allow the deceased to communicate in the afterlife, while the discovery of a papyrus fragment containing a passage from Homer’s Iliad and various bronze and terracotta figurines such as Cupid and Harpocrates underscores the fusion of Greek literary culture and Greco-Roman religious iconography with local Egyptian burial customs.

== National holiday ==
The national holiday of the Minya governorate is on 18 March. It commemorates those who were executed by the British at Deir Mawas on 18 March 1919 after a number of villagers ambushed a train transporting English soldiers

== Industrial zones ==
According to the Governing Authority for Investment and Free Zones (GAFI), the following industrial zones are located in Minya:

Zone name
El Metahra Industrial Zone
New Minya Industrial Zone
Wadi El Sararyah

== Agriculture and industry ==
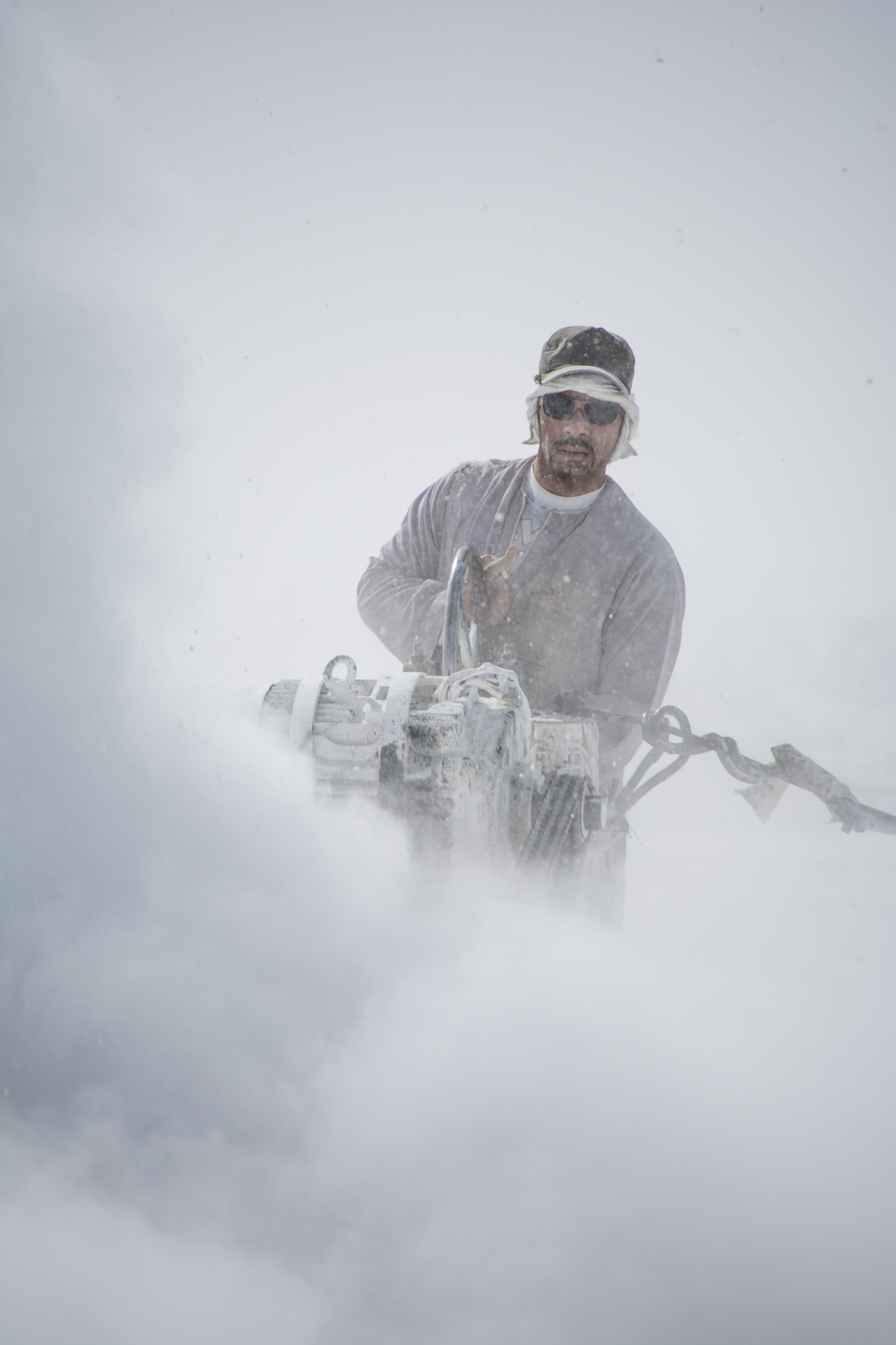
A man working in a limestone quarry

Minya Governorate is an important agricultural and industrial region. Among its principal crops are sugarcane, cotton, beans, soybeans, garlic, onions, vegetables of various sorts, tomatoes, potatoes, watermelons, and grapes. Among the leading local industries are food processing (especially sugar and the drying and grinding of onions), spinning and weaving of cotton, perfumes, oils and fats, cement-making, quarrying (especially limestone), and brick-making.

== Important sites ==
- Akhetaten (Amarna)
- Dehenet (Akoris or Tihna el-Gebel)
- Ansena (Antinoöpolis or Sheikh Ibada)
- Beni Hasan
- Deir el-Bersha
- el-Sheikh Sa'id
- Fraser Tombs
- Hatnub
- Hebenu (Kom el-Ahmar)
- Herwer (Hur)
- Khmun (Hermopolis Magna or el-Ashmunein)
- Per Medjed (Oxyrhynchus or el-Bahnasa)
- Sharuna (el-Kom el-Ahmar Sawaris)
- Speos Artemidos (Istabl Antar)
- Tuna el-Gebel
- Zawyet el-Maiyitin

== Monasteries in the Minya Governorate ==
- Monastery of Saint Fana, near Mallawi

== Notable people ==
- Hoda Shaarawi, female activist
- Abdel Hakim Amer, military general
- Ahmed Sayed, footballer
- Akhenaten, Pharaoh of the Eighteenth dynasty
- Akram Habib, Biblical scholar and social activist
- Hakim, folkloric singer
- Khufu, second Pharaoh of the Fourth dynasty
- Louis Awad, writer and intellectual
- Maria al-Qibtiyya, wife of Muhammad
- Sanaa Gamil, actress
- Suzanne Mubarak, the former first lady of Egypt
- Taha Hussein, writer and intellectual
- Mervat Amin, actress
- Ahmed Hassan, Former captain of Egyptian Football Team

== Statistics ==
- Total area: 32,279 km².
- Proportion of the land area of Egypt: 3.2%.
- Population: around 6.3 million
- Population density: 115 people/km²
- Rural population:
- Proportion of the population of Egypt: 5.1%
- Population growth rate:
- Minya Governorate administrative divisions: 9 localities, 57 local administrative units, 346 small villages, and 1,429 tiny villages.

== See also ==
- 2016 Minya pogrom

== Sources ==
- The Egyptian Tourist Authority - ETA
