= Unaybis =

Village in Egypt

Unaybis عنيبس
- Village
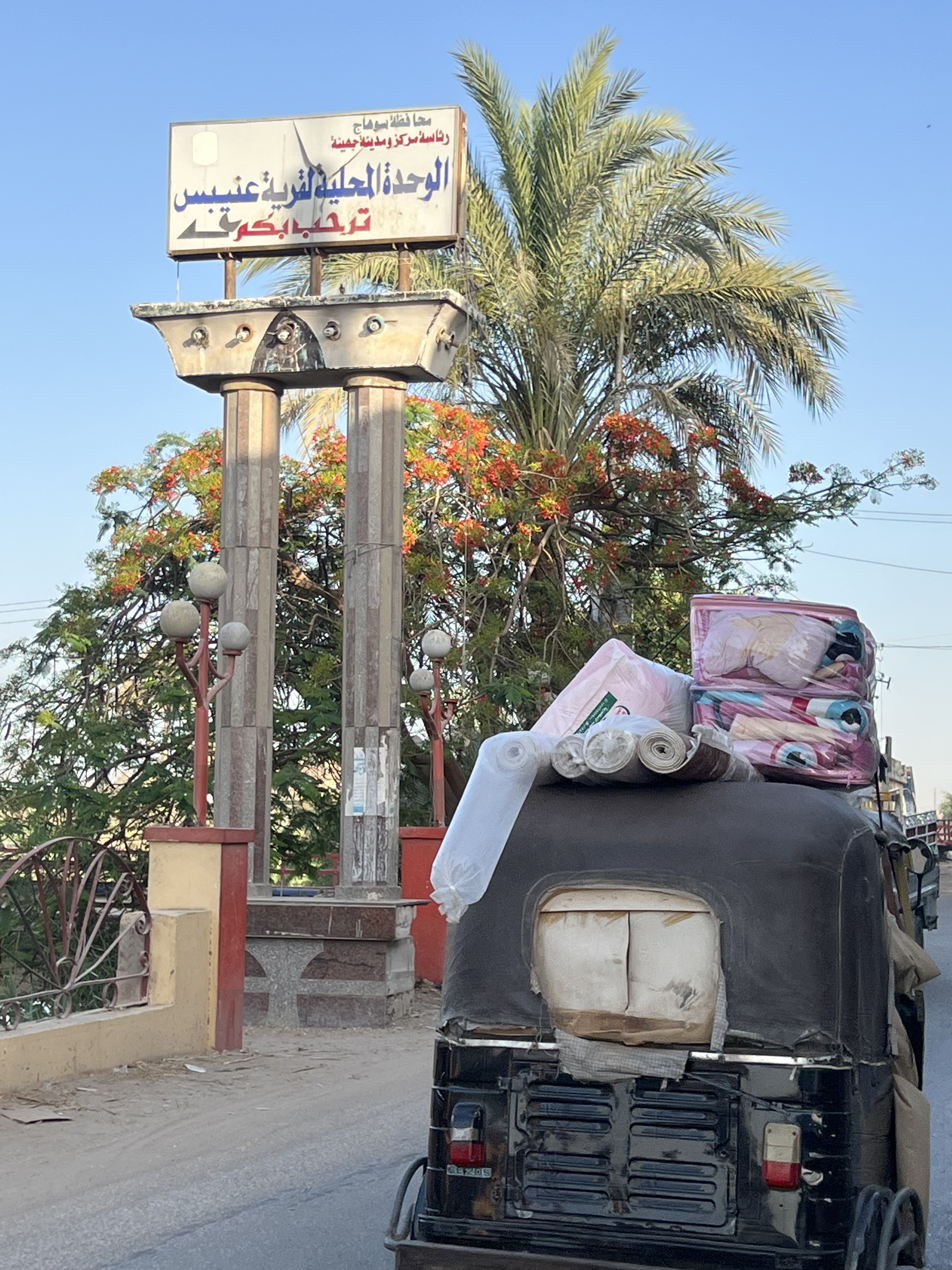
- Interactive map of Unaybis عنيبس
- Coordinates: 26°43′32″N 31°30′03″E
- Country: Egypt
- Governorate: Sohag
- Markaz: Jahina

Population (January 2023)
  - Total: 36,852
- Time zone: UTC+2 (EET)
  - Summer (DST): UTC+3 (EEST)

Unaybis (Arabic: عنيبس) is a village in the markaz of Jahina, located in the Sohag Governorate in the Arab Republic of Egypt. The population is 36,852 people, of whom 18,552 are men and 18,300 are women.
