= Naza Al-Mahzamin =

Village in Egypt

Nazzat Al-Mahzamin نزة المحزمين
- Village
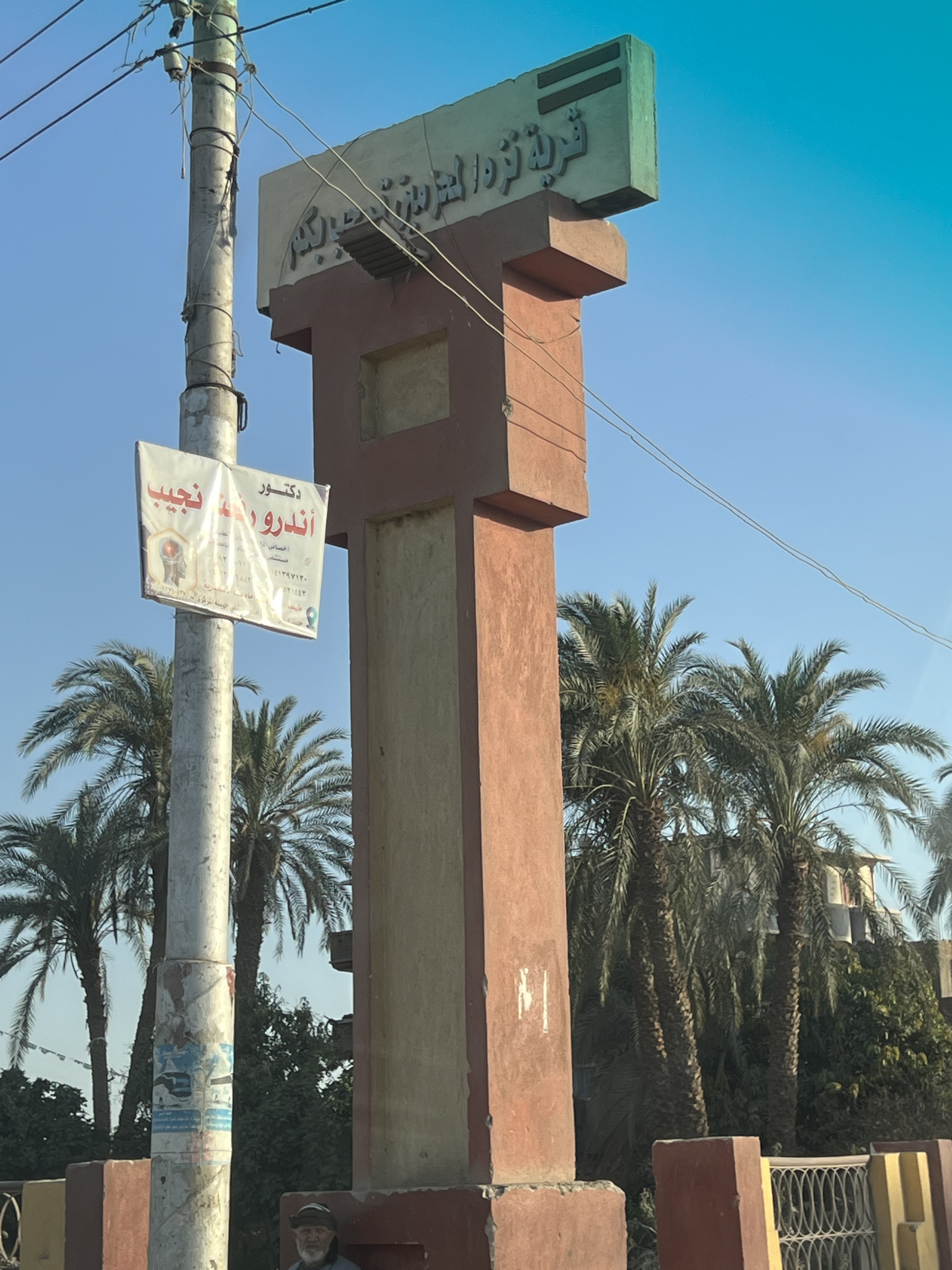
- Interactive map of Nazzat Al-Mahzamin نزة المحزمين
- Coordinates: 26°42′39″N 31°28′11″E
- Country: Egypt
- Governorate: Sohag
- Markaz: Jahina

Population (January 2023)
  - Total: 10,642
- Time zone: UTC+2 (EET)
  - Summer (DST): UTC+3 (EEST)

Nazzat Al-Mahzamin (Arabic: نزة المحزمين) is a village in the markaz of Jahina, in the Sohag Governorate in the Arab Republic of Egypt. The population is 10,642 people, of whom 5,422 are men and 5,220 are women.
