= Omar bin Al-Khattab (Sohag) =

Village in Sohag Governorate, Egypt

Omar Ibn Al-Khattab عمر بن الخطاب
- Village
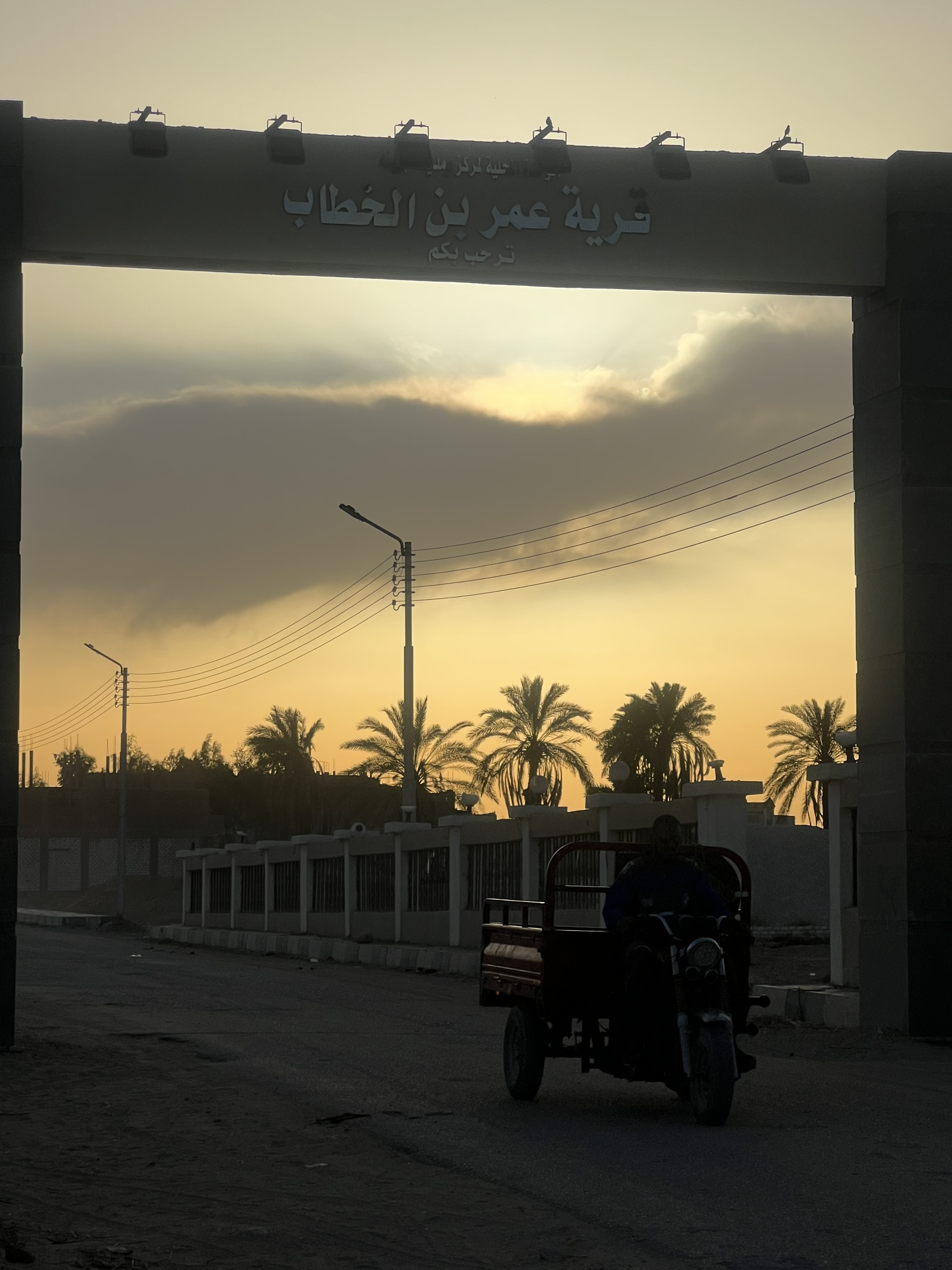
- Interactive map of Omar Ibn Al-Khattab عمر بن الخطاب
- Coordinates: 26°40′53″N 31°26′38″E
- Country: Egypt
- Governorate: Sohag
- Markaz: Jahina

Population (January 2023)
  - Total: 4,322
- Time zone: UTC+2 (EET)
  - Summer (DST): UTC+3 (EEST)

Omar Ibn Al-Khattab (Arabic: عمر بن الخطاب) is a village in the markaz of Jahina, in the Sohag Governorate in the Arab Republic of Egypt. The population is 4,322 people, of whom 2,211 are men and 2,111 are women.
