= Jahina =

City and markaz in Egypt

Jahina جهينة
- City and markaz
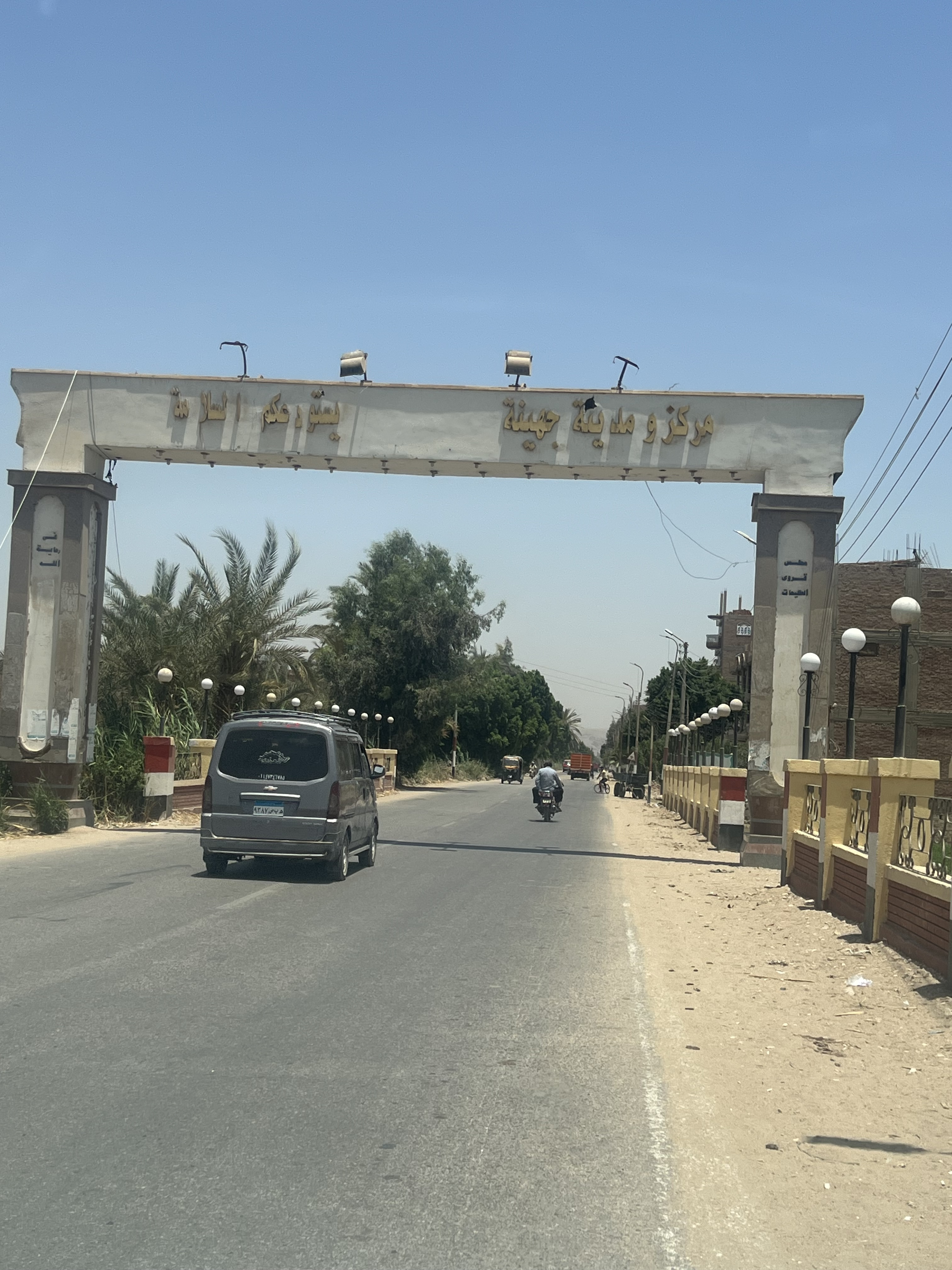
- Interactive map of Jahina جهينة
- Coordinates: 26°40′44″N 31°29′26″E
- Country: Egypt
- Governorate: Sohag

Population (January 2023)
  - Total: 247,743
- Time zone: UTC+2 (EET)
  - Summer (DST): UTC+3 (EEST)

Jahina (Arabic: جهينة) is a city and markaz in the Sohag Governorate of Egypt with an area of 1,547 km^{2}.

== Population ==
It has a population of 247,743, of whom 119,378 are men and 128,365 women.
