= Akram =

Akram (Arabic: أکرم), is a given name and surname, derived from the Arabic root word Karam (كرم), meaning "generosity". In the Arabic language, Akram is a comparative adjective and means “most generous,” “most noble,” or "most bountiful." In Turkey and Eastern Europe, the name is also rendered as Ekrem/Eqrem. Notable people with the name include:

== Given name ==
- Akram Abdel-Majeed (born 1970), Egyptian footballer
- Akram Afif (born 1996), Qatari footballer
- Akram Ahmed (died 2020), Bangladeshi Air Force pilot
- Akram al-Ajouri, Palestinian terrorist group leader
- Akram Al-Ashqar (born 1982), Palestinian film director, photographer, and IT professional
- Akram Al-Noor (born 1987), Yemeni taekwondo practitioner
- Akram Al-Selwi (born 1986), Yemeni footballer
- Akram Al-Worafi (born 1986), Yemeni footballer
- Akram Aldroubi, American mathematician
- Akram Ansari (born 1954), Pakistani politician
- Akram Monfared Arya (born 1946), Iranian pilot
- Akram Assem (born 1965), Afghan historian and author
- Akram Aylisli (born 1937), Azerbaijani writer, playwright, novelist, and politician
- Akram Ayyad (born 1991), Libyan footballer
- Akram Bounabi (born 1999), Algerian fencer
- Akram Cheema, Pakistani politician
- Akram Chehayeb (born 1947), Lebanese politician
- Akram Hossain Chowdhury (1954/55-2023), Bangladeshi politician
- Akram Dashti, Pakistani politician
- Akram Djahnit (born 1991), Algerian footballer
- Akram Khan Durrani (born 1960), Pakistani politician
- Akram Emmanuel (born 1967), Iraqi footballer
- Akram Fahimian (born 1990), Iranian poet
- Akram Abdul Ghanee (born 1987), Maldivian footballer
- Akram Masih Gill, Pakistani politician
- Akram Habib (born 1965), Egyptian-British biblical scholar, pracademic, social activist, and human rights advocate
- Akram Hamidi (born 1999), French-Algerian kickboxer and muay thai fighter
- Akram Haniyah (born 1953), Palestinian journalist
- Akram Hasson (born 1959), Israeli politician
- Akram al-Hawrani (1911–1996), Syrian politician
- Akram al-Homsi, Jordanian politician
- Akram Hamid Begzadeh Jaff (1929–2010), Iraqi politician
- Akram al-Kaabi (born 1977), Iraqi politician
- Akram Khan (born 1968), Bangladeshi cricketer
- Akram Khan (born 1970), Indian politician
- Akram Khan (born 1974), English dancer and choreographer
- Akram Fouad Khater (born 1960), Lebanese-American professor, historian, and author
- Akram Khatoon (born 1937), Pakistani banker
- Akram Khodabandeh (born 1991), Iranian taekwondo practitioner
- Akram Khpalwak, Afghan politician
- Akram Khuzam, al-Jazeera journalist
- Akram Mahinan (born 1993), Malaysian footballer
- Akram Moghrabi (born 1985), Lebanese footballer
- Akram Mohammadi (born 1958), Iranian actress
- Akram Msallam (born 1971), Palestinian novelist
- Akram Ojjeh (1918–1991), Saudi businessman
- Akram Osman (1937–2016), Afghan writer and novelist
- Akram Pahalwan (born 1987), Pakistani wrestler
- Akram Pedramnia (born 1969), Iranian-Canadian writer, translator, Joycean scholar, researcher, activist, and physician
- Akram Raza (born 1964), Pakistani cricketer
- Akram Roumani (born 1978), Moroccan footballer
- Akram El Hadi Salim (born 1987), Sudanese football goalkeeper
- Akram Salman (born 1945), Iraqi football manager
- Akram Shah (born 1978), Indian judoka
- Akram Shammaa (1930–2012), Syrian politician, lawyer, and real estate investor
- Akram Sheikh, Pakistani attorney and politician
- Akram Tawfik (born 1997), Egyptian footballer
- Akram Toofani (1930–2021), Pakistani Islamic scholar
- Akram Temam (born 2017),CEO of The Treehouse Crew
- Akram Umarov (born 1994), Kyrgyzstani footballer
- Akram Yari (1940–1979), Afghan politician
- Akram Yosri (born 1994), Egyptian handball player
- Akram Yurabayev (born 1973), Uzbekistani sprint canoer
- Akram Zaatari (born 1966), Lebanese filmmaker, photographer, archival artist, and curator
- Akram Zaki (1931–2017), Pakistani politician and literary scholar
- Akram uz-Zaman, Bengali politician and member of the Meghalaya Legislative Assembly
- Akram Zuway (born 1991), Libyan footballer
- Akram Adam (born 2004), British American football player

== Surname ==
- Ahmed Akram (born 1996), Egyptian swimmer
- Barmak Akram (born 1966), Afghani filmmaker
- Malik Faisal Akram (1977–2022), perpetrator of the Colleyville synagogue hostage crisis
- Nashat Akram (born 1984), Iraqi football player

Naveed Akram (born 1984), retired Pakistani football player
Naveed Akram (born 2001), an Australian charged with terrorism and 15 murders, in relation to the 14 December 2025 Bondi Beech shooting.

- Nawaal Akram (born 1998/99), Qatari comedian
- Omar Akram (born 1964), American pianist
- S. M. Akram (1943/1944–2024), Bangladeshi politician and government bureaucrat
- Sajid Akram (1974/1975‑2025), alleged terrorist, shot dead by police at Bondi Beech, Sydney.
- Wasim Akram (born 1966), Pakistani cricketer

== See also ==
- Karim, derived from the Arabic root word K-R-M
