= Ekrem =

- Pronunciation: [ecˈɾæm]
- Gender: Male

Origin
- Origin: Turkish
- Meaning: Generous, benevolent, magnanimous
- Region of origin: Turkey

Other names
- Related names: Akram, Ekram

Ekrem is a Turkish form of the Arabic given name Akram, meaning "kind", "generous", or "benevolent." Sometimes rendered Eqrem in Albania. Notable people with these names include:

== Ekrem ==
- Ekrem Akurgal (1911–2002), Turkish archaeologist
- Ekrem Al (born 1955), Turkish footballer
- Ekrem Alican (1916–2000), Turkish politician
- Ekrem Bardha (born 1933), Albanian-American businessman
- Ekrem Bora (1934–2012), Turkish film actor
- Eko Fresh (real name Ekrem Bora, born 1983), German-Turkish rapper
- Ekrem Boyalı (born 1970), Turkish taekwondo practitioner and coach
- Ekrem Buğra Ekinci (born 1966), Turkish academic
- Ekrem Buyukkaya, executive at Gab (social network)
- Ekrem Bradarić (born 1969), Bosnian footballer
- Ekrem Çelebi (born 1965), Turkish politician and parliamentarian
- Ekrem Celil (born 1980), Turkish weightlifter
- Ekrem Cemilpaşa (1891–1973), Kurdish politician and officer
- Ekrem Dağ (born 1980), Austrian footballer of Turkish descent
- Ekrem Dumanlı (born 1964), Turkish journalist
- Ekrem Ekinci, Turkish chemist and academic
- Ekrem Ekşioğlu (born 1978), Turkish footballer
- Ekrem Eylisli (born 1937), Azerbaijani writer and parliamentarian
- Ekrem Gench (born 1974), Bulgarian footballer
- Ekrem Gökay Yüksel (born 1981), Turkish politician
- Ekrem Ibrić (born 1962), Yugoslav football player
- Ekrem İmamoğlu (born 1970), Turkish politician and current mayor of Istanbul
- Ekrem Jevrić (1961–2016), Montenegrin singer and musician
- Ekrem Kahya (born 1978), Turkish-Dutch footballer
- Ekrem Kılıçarslan (born 1997), Turkish footballer
- Ekrem Koçak (1931–1993), Turkish middle distance runner
- Ekrem Lagumdžija (born 1965), Bosnian volleyball player
- Ekrem Libohova (1882–1948), Albanian politician
- Ekrem Memnun (born 1969), Turkish basketball coach
- Ekrem Öztürk (born 1997), Turkish wrestler
- Ekrem Rexha (1961–2000), Kosovo Liberation Army commander
- Ekrem Sancaklı (born 2001), Turkish basketballer
- Ekrem Spahiu (born 1960), Albanian politician

== Middle namer ==
- Ali Ekrem Bolayır (1867–1937), Turkish politician and Ottoman governor of Jerusalem
- Ercüment Ekrem Talu (1886–1956), Turkish writer and journalist
- Gazi Ekrem Husrev Pasha (died 1362), Ottoman Bosnian vizier
- György Ekrem-Kemál (1946–2009), Hungarian nationalist political figure
- Hamid Ekrem Šahinović (1882–1936), Bosniak writer and dramatist
- Recaizade Mahmud Ekrem (1847–1914), Turkish bureaucrat and intellectual
- Reşat Ekrem Koçu (1905–1975), Turkish writer and historian
- Selma Ekrem (1902–1986), Turkish-American writer

== Eqrem ==
- Eqrem Basha (born 1948), Kosovan writer
- Eqrem Çabej (1908–1980), Albanian scholar
- Eqrem Konçi (1937–1997), Albanian chess player
- Eqrem Vlora (1885–1964), Albanian politician

== See also ==
- Akram
- Ekram (disambiguation)
