= Ekram =

Ekram may refer to:

- Ekram (film), a 2018 Indian film
- Ekram, a given name, variant of Ikram; notable people with the name include:
  - Ekram Ali (born 1950), Indian poet
  - Ekram Hossain (born 1974), Canadian engineer
  - Khaleda Ekram, Bangladeshi architect
  - Ekramuddin Ahmad (1872-1940), Bengali litterateur

== See also ==
- Ekrem, alternative form of the given name
- ECRAM, a type of computer RAM
