= Ekinci =

Ekinci is a Turkish word that may refer to:

== People ==
- Ekrem Ekinci, Turkish scientist and academic
- Ekrem Buğra Ekinci (born 1966), Turkish academic
- Nurcihan Ekinci, Turkish female para taekwondo practitioner
- Tuğba Ekinci (born 1976), Turkish pop singer
- Yusuf Ekinci (1942–1994), Turkish Kurdish communist separatist

== Places ==
- Ekinci, Adıyaman, a village in the district of Adıyaman, Adıyaman Province, Turkey
- Ekinci, Kahta, a village in the district of Kahta, Adıyaman Province, Turkey

== See also ==
- Ekinci, Erzincan
- Ekinciler, Göynük, a village in the district of Göynük, Bolu Province
