= Failed state (disambiguation) =

A failed state is a state perceived as having failed at some of the basic conditions and responsibilities of a sovereign government.

Failed State or Failed States may also refer to:

- Failed States (album), a 2012 album by Propagandhi
- Failed States: The Abuse of Power and the Assault on Democracy, a 2006 book by Noam Chomsky
