= Neelesh B. Mehta =

Indian communications engineer and inventor

- Born: India
- Education: IIT Madras; California Institute of Technology
- Known for: Studies on wireless networks
- Awards: 2010 INAE Young Engineer Award; 2014 NASI-Scopus Young Scientist Award; 2016 EE Times Featured Engineer; 2016PRL Hari Om Ashram Prerit Vikram Sarabhai Research Award; 2017 Shanti Swarup Bhatnagar Prize
- Scientific career
- Fields: Communications engineering
- Workplaces: Indian Institute of Science; AT&T Labs; Broadcom; Mitsubishi Electric Research Laboratories
- Doctoral advisor: Andrea Goldsmith

Neelesh B. Mehta is an Indian communications engineer, inventor and a professor at the Department of Electrical and Communications Engineering of the Indian Institute of Science who studies wireless networks.

== Biography ==
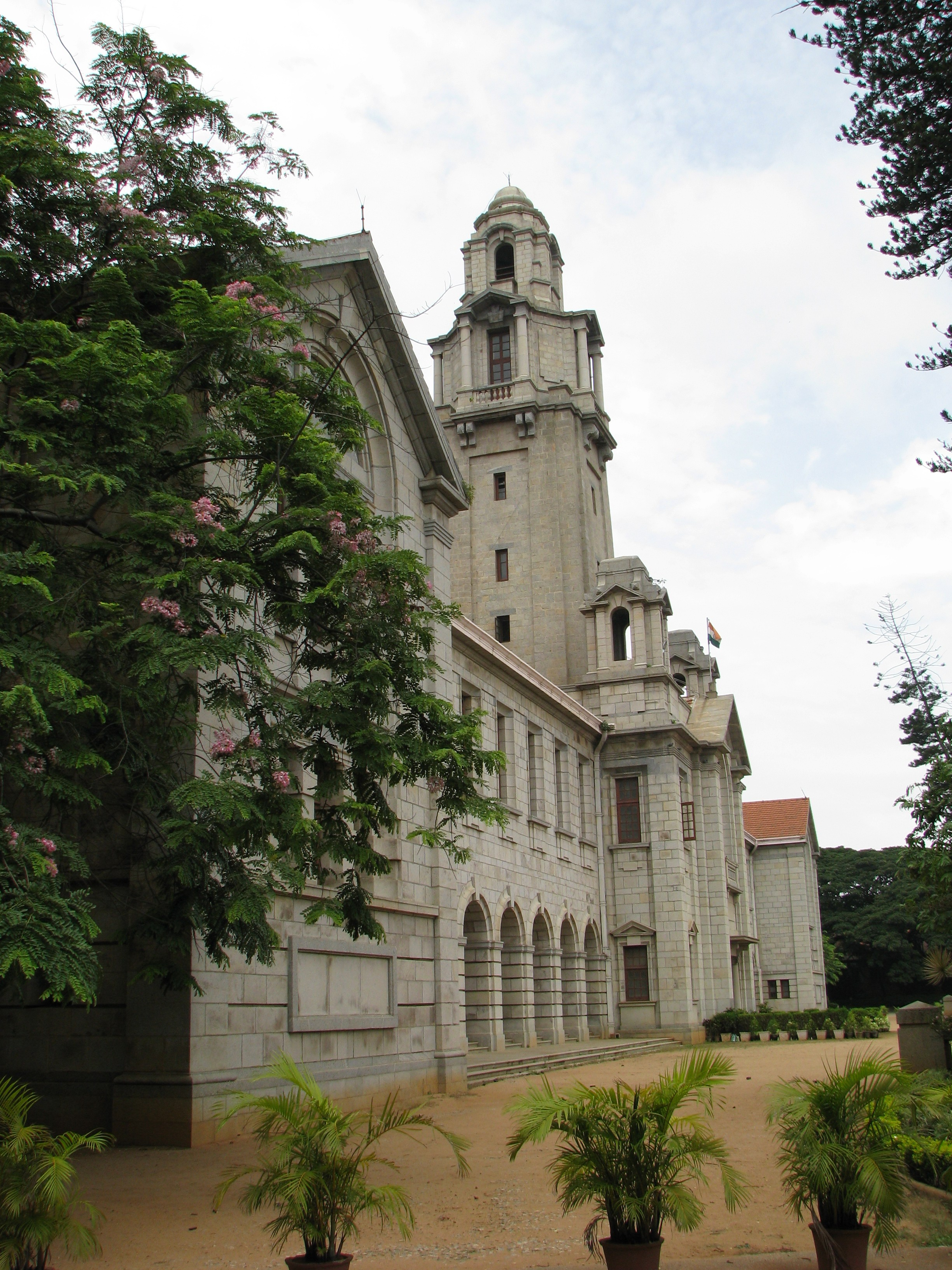
Indian Institute of Science

Neelesh Mehtha was born on 9 January 1975. He won the Indian National Mathematical Olympiad at the state level in 1991 and the next year, he was selected for the National Talent Search Scholarship which helped fund his undergraduate work at the Indian Institute of Technology, Madras from 1992 to 1996. He earned his MS in engineering in 1997 from California Institute of Technology and won the AT&T World Leadership Award in the process. He continued at the institution for his doctoral studies under the guidance of Andrea Goldsmith of Stanford University and after securing a PhD in electrical engineering in 2000, he started his career in 2001 as a research scientist at AT&T Labs.

Mehta's stay in the US would last till 2007 during which period, he also worked with Broadcom (2002–03) and Mitsubishi Electric Research Laboratories (2003–07). He returned to India in September 2007 to take up the position of an assistant professor at the Electrical Communication Engineering Department of the Indian Institute of Science where he was appointed associate professor since 2011. His has focused on energy harvesting wireless networks, interference modeling and co-operative communications, with special focus on the design, invention, and performance analysis of various technologies.

Mehta is a former member-at-large of the IEEE Communications Society (2014–15) and served as the director of corporate publications during 2012–13. He has been associated with three of its journals, IEEE Transactions on Communications, IEEE Wireless Communication Letters and IEEE Transactions on Wireless Communications, serving as the executive editor of the last mentioned.

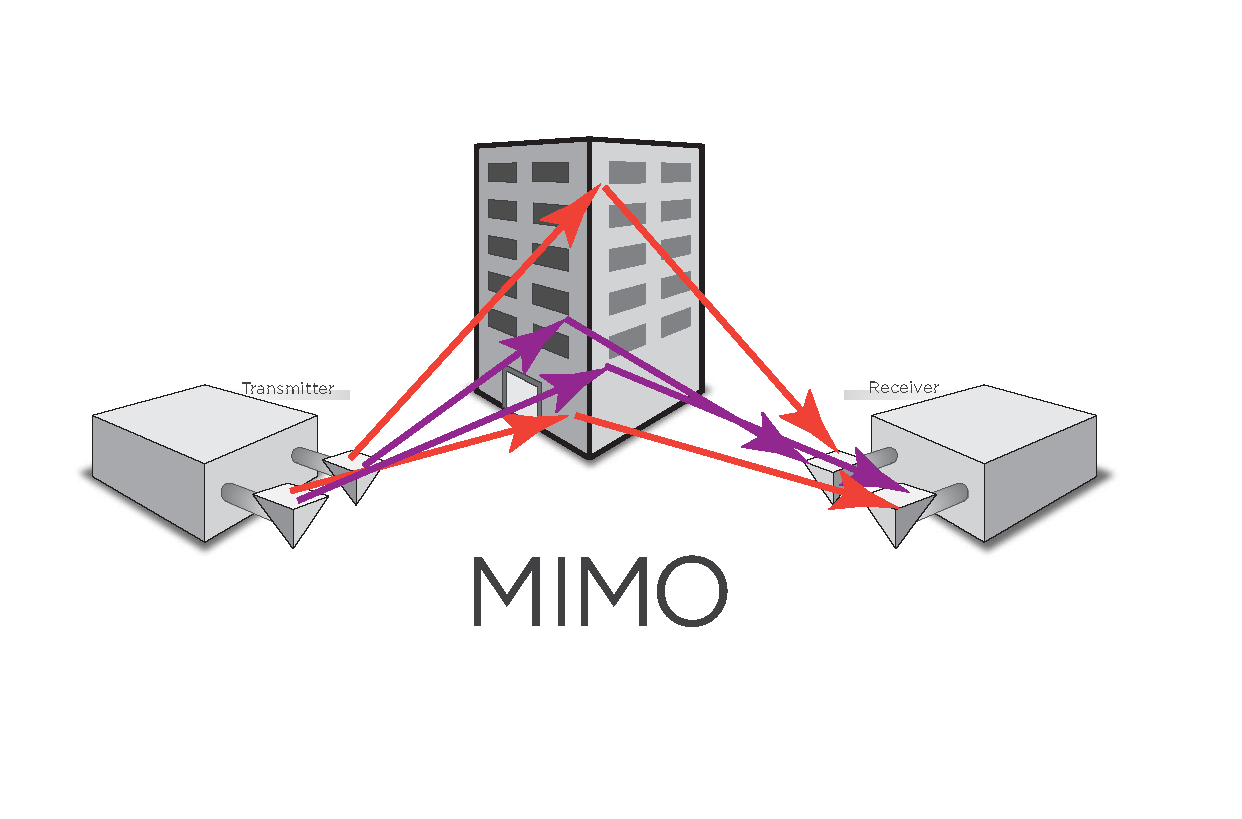
MIMO system

== Awards and honors ==
Mehta received the Young Engineer Award of the Indian National Academy of Engineering in 2010. The National Academy of Sciences, India elected him as a fellow in 2013; a year later the academy would honor him again with the 2014 NASI-Scopus Young Scientist award. The same year, the Department of Science and Technology selected him for the Swarnajayanti Fellowship, the tenure of the fellowship running until 2019. He became an elected fellow of the Indian National Academy of Engineering in 2015 and a Featured Engineer of EE Times, the next year. He received one more award in 2016 in the form of Hari Om Ashram Prerit Vikram Sarabhai Research Award of Physical Research Laboratory. The Council of Scientific and Industrial Research awarded him the Shanti Swarup Bhatnagar Prize, one of the highest Indian science awards in 2017. The following year, Mehta became a laureate of the Asian Scientist 100 by the Asian Scientist.

== Selected bibliography ==
=== Chapters ===
- Ekram Hossain, Vijay K. Bhargava, Gerhard P. Fettweis (Editors); Neelsh B. Mehta, Chandra R. Murthy (Chapter authors) (5 July 2012). "PHY and MAC Layer Optimization for Energy-harvesting Wireless Networks". Green Radio Communication Networks. Cambridge University Press. pp. 53–. ISBN 978-1-107-01754-2.
- Mehta, Neelesh B; Molisch, Andreas F (2018). "Chapter 6: Antenna Selection in MIIMO Systems". In Tsoulos, George (ed.). MIMO System Technology for Wireless Communications. CRC Press. ISBN 9781351837903.

=== Articles ===
- Neelesh B. Mehta; Sarabjot Singh; Andreas F. Molisch (2010). "An Accurate Model for Interference from Spatially Distributed Shadowed Users in CDMA Uplinks". GLOBECOM 2009 - 2009 IEEE Global Telecommunications Conference. pp. 1–6. doi:10.1109/GLOCOM.2009.5425277. ISBN 978-1-4244-4148-8. S2CID 447899.
- Salil Kashyap; Neelesh B. Mehta (2013). "SEP-Optimal Transmit Power Policy for Peak Power and Interference Outage Probability Constrained Underlay Cognitive Radios". IEEE Transactions on Wireless Communications. 12 (12): 6371–6381. doi:10.1109/TWC.2013.111013.130615. S2CID 6503790.
- A. Karthik; Neelesh B. Mehta (2013). "En Masse Relay Selection Algorithms for Multi-Source, Multi-Relay, Decode-and-Forward Cooperative Systems". IEEE Transactions on Communications. 61 (8): 3170–3180. doi:10.1109/TCOMM.2013.070213.120839. S2CID 819131.

== See also ==
- 3GPP
- E-UTRA
- LTE
- Radio propagation model
