= Rahnaward Zaryab =

Afghan writer (1944–2020)

Rahnaward Zaryab رهنورد زریاب
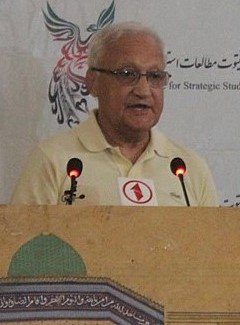
- in 2016
- Born: August 1944; Kabul, Afghanistan
- Died: 10 December 2020 (aged 76); Kabul, Afghanistan
- Education: Kabul University; University of South Wales
- Occupations: Writer, journalist
- Known for: Research in philosophy, psychology, and sociology
- Spouse: Spojmaï Zaryab
- Children: 3

Rahnaward Zaryab (Farsi Dari رهنورد زریاب, August 1944 – 10 December 2020) was a novelist, short story writer, and journalist from Afghanistan.

== Biography ==
He was born in 1944, in the Rika Khana neighborhood of Kabul, Afghanistan, He was married to Spôjmaï Zariâb with whom he has three daughters. He received a degree in journalism from Kabul University, and pursued further education in Wales and New Zealand. Zaryab wrote in Dari Persian, the variety of the Persian language spoken in Afghanistan.

On his return to Afghanistan in the early 1970s he took a job with the prominent Zhwandoon Magazine as a crime reporter. He has said that he sought the job because it gave him material for his stories. He has continued to work as a print and TV journalist and editor throughout his career and in the spring of 2015 worked as an editor for Tolo TV in Kabul, Afghanistan's largest private broadcaster. He has also held government positions in the Culture Ministry of Afghanistan.

Zaryab lived in exile in France during the 1990s but returned to Kabul after the fall of the Taliban. His wife and three daughters live in Paris, France.

Despite critical and commercial success as an author in the 1970s, his ability to make a living from writing has suffered along with the prospects of the Afghanistan middle and intellectual classes since the time of the 1979 Soviet invasion. Also, the bookshops that now exist in Kabul tend to sell bootleg copies of Iranian works. This did not stop him from continuing to write, though he said he did so mostly for himself.

He died from COVID-19 in Kabul on 10 December 2020, aged 76, during the COVID-19 pandemic in Afghanistan.

== Selected works ==
- Aktare Maskhara, 1980 (screenplay)
- Qalandar Nama, 2014, Kabul
- “The Re-creation of a Middle Eastern Story in Latin America,” with Guilan Silassi, Journal of Persianate Studies, Vol 4 No 2, (2011) 272–285.
- “The Beauty Sleeping under Earth,” and, “The Purse Thief,” stories both translated into English and collected in, Short Stories from Afghanistan, 2002, Shah M Book Co., Kabul
- Shama-e-dar shabistane, (in Persian) 1990s, Kabul (listed on worldcat.org)
- Gulnar-o-abina, (in Persian) 1990s, Kabul. (listed on worldcat.org)
- “The Hawk and the Tree,” very short story, available here: The_Hawk_and_the_Tree (translation by Wasef Bakhtari)
- “A Brief Look at Modern Fiction Prose,” an essay of literary criticism and history. Zaryab connects literature in Afghanistan to its different political periods. (This work is referenced in the preface to, Real Men Keep their Word: Tales from Kabul, Afghanistan : a Selection of Akram Osman's Dari Short Stories, Akram Osman, New York, 2005)
- Poverty period of hallucination, (short stories, in Dari/Persian), Kabul, Maiwand Printing Press, 2004
