= Minya, Egypt =

Minya المنيا ⲧⲙⲱⲛⲏ, ⲧⲙⲟⲟⲛⲉ
- City
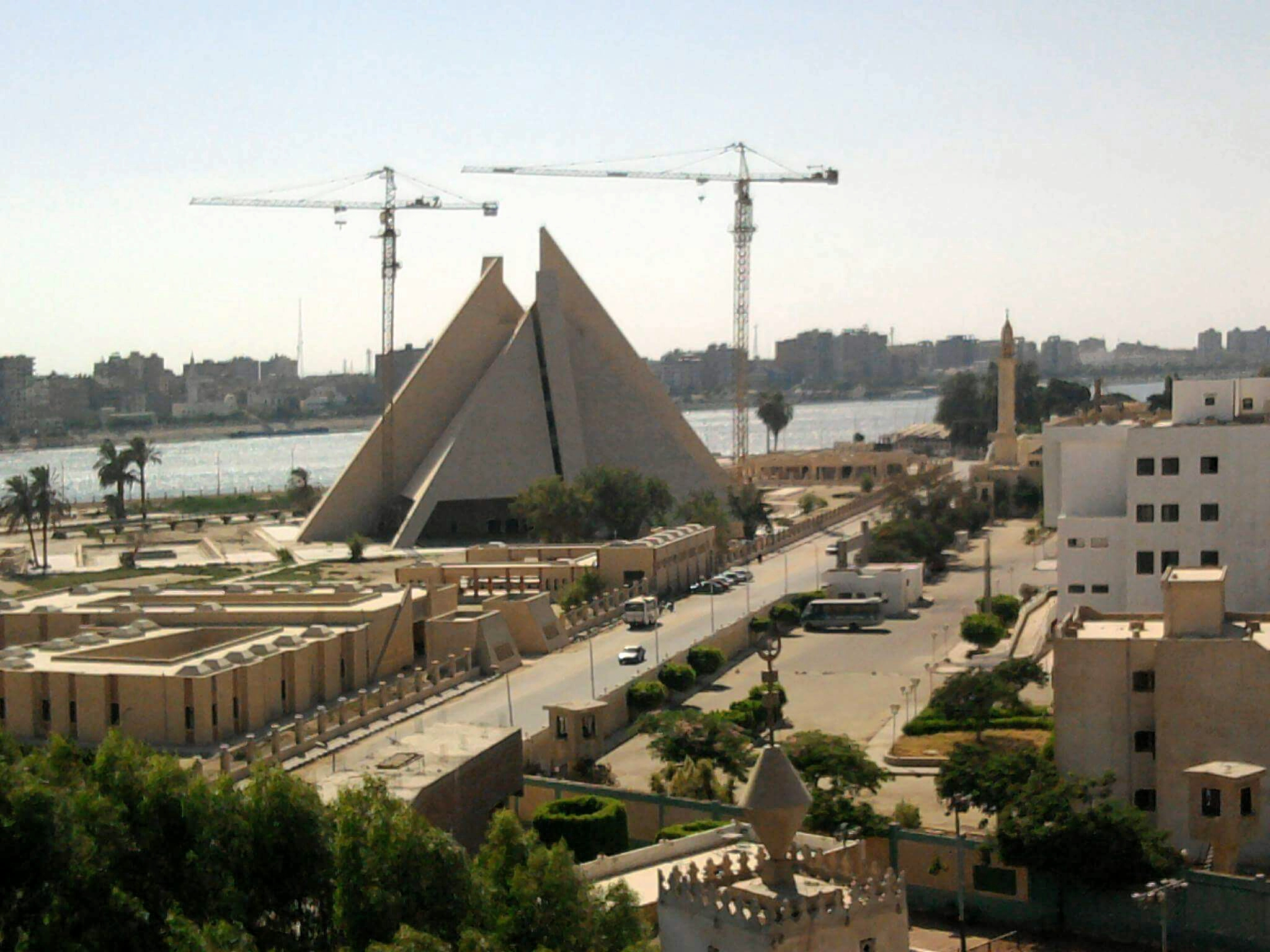
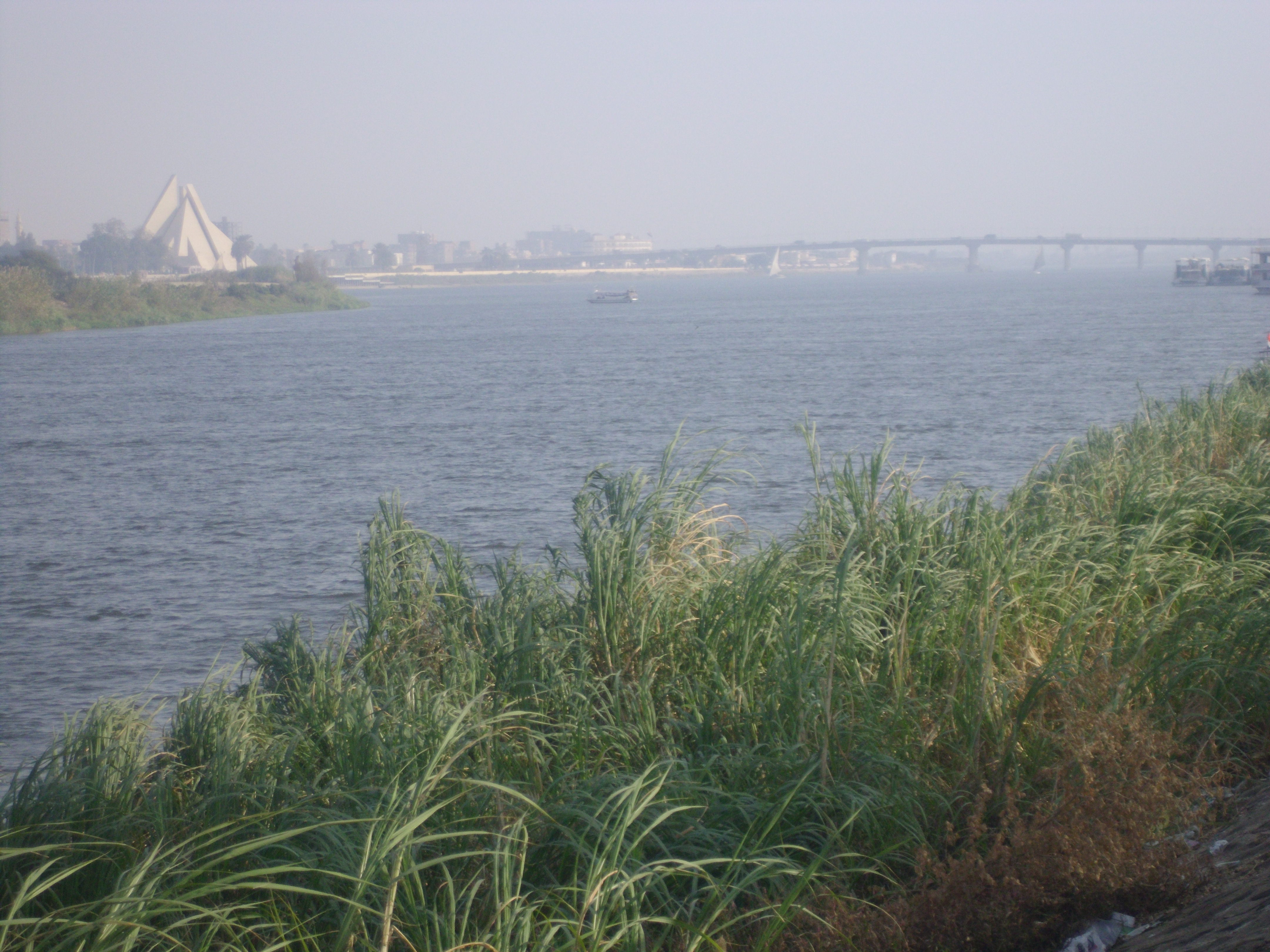
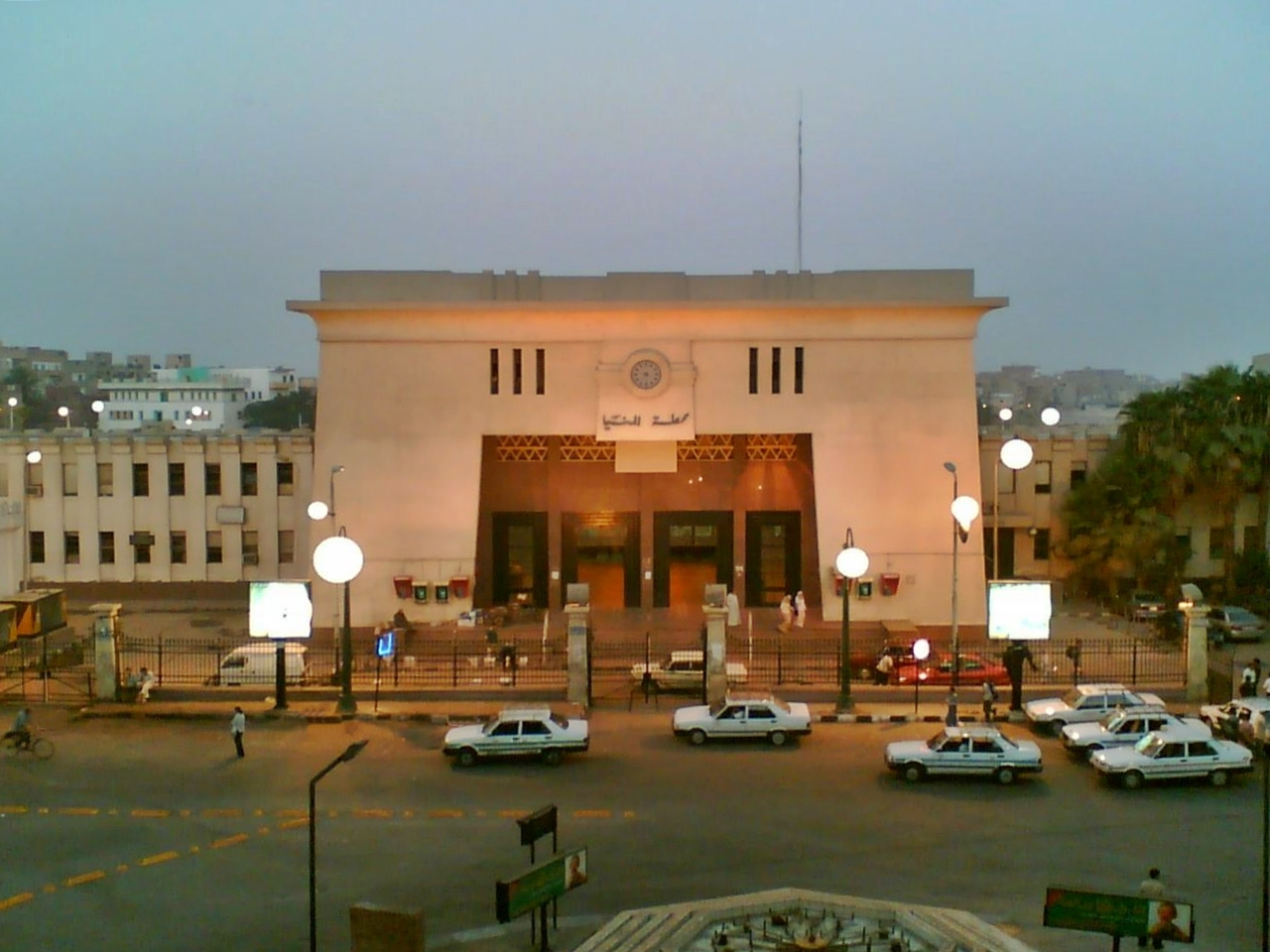
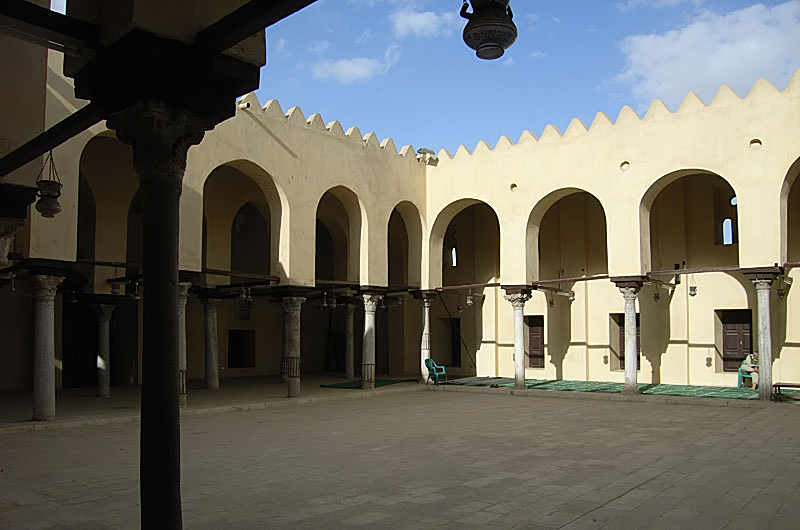
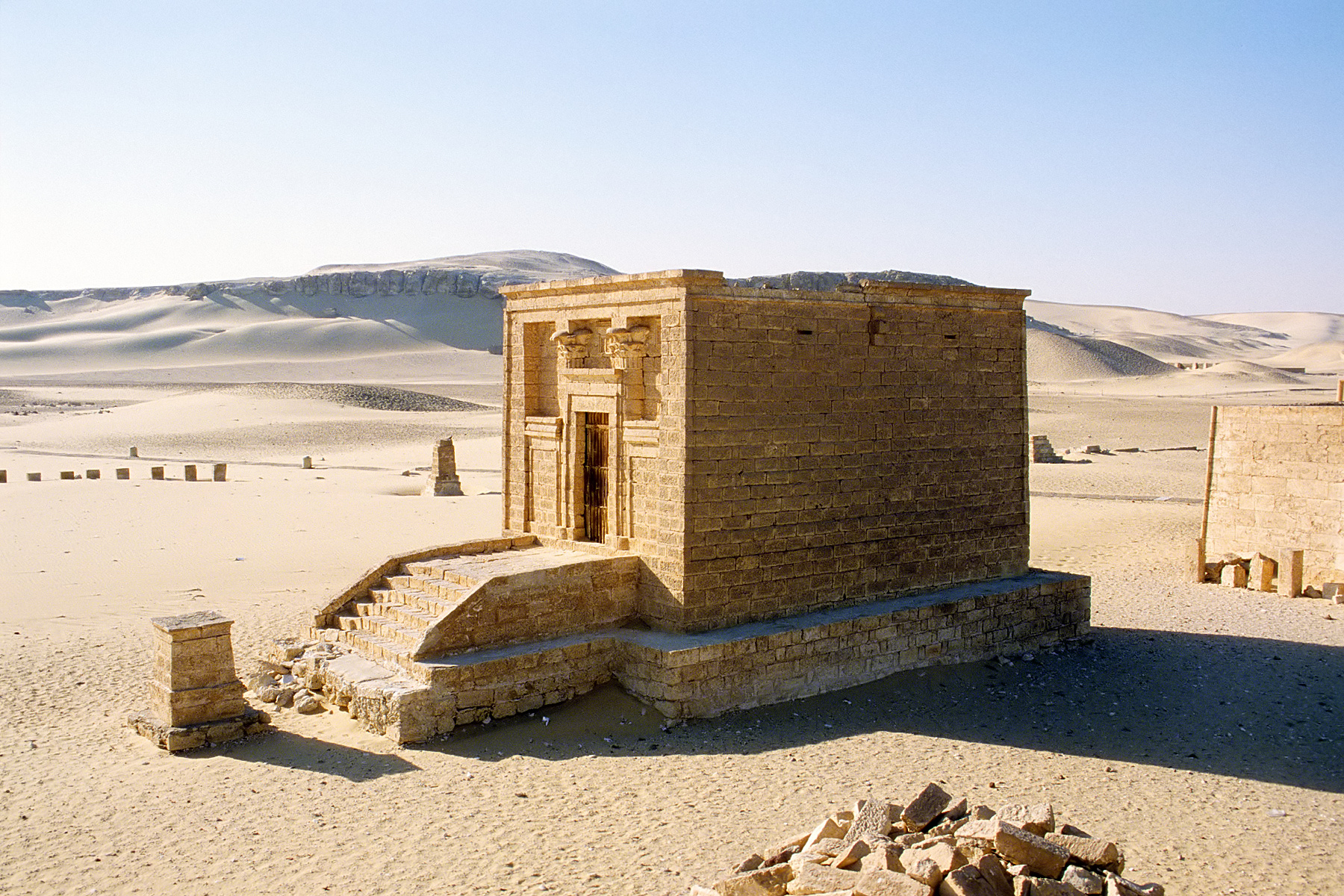
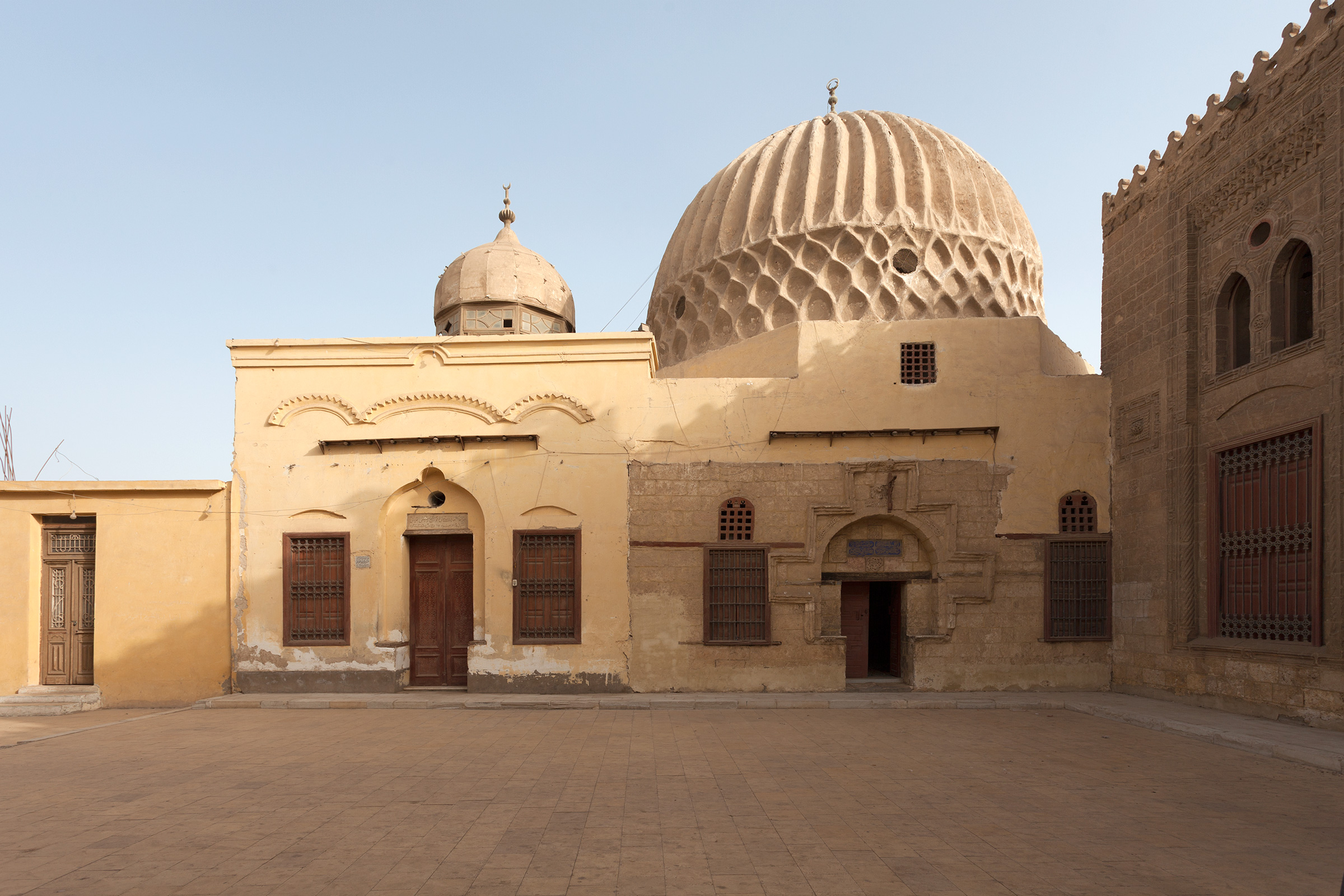
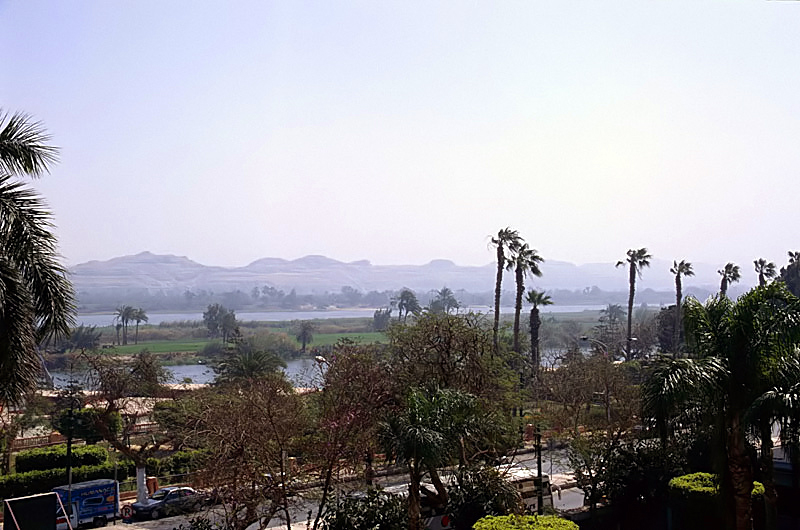
- Akhenaten museum, Aton Museum, Minya station, Gebel Tuna Ptolemaios, Lamati Court, Qayat Al-Qayati Mausoleum, Minya corniche

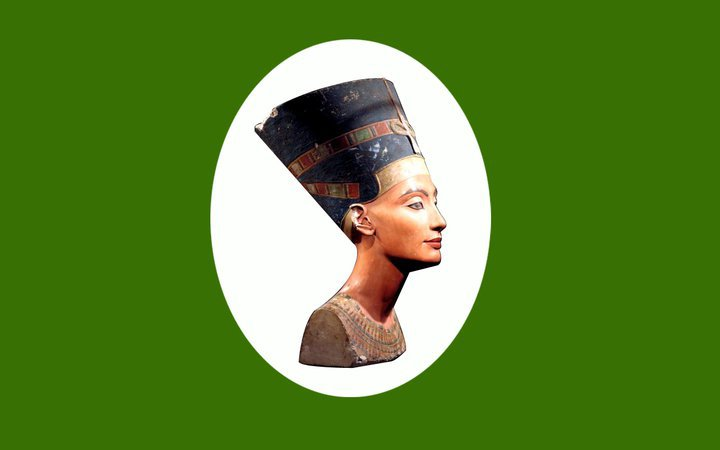
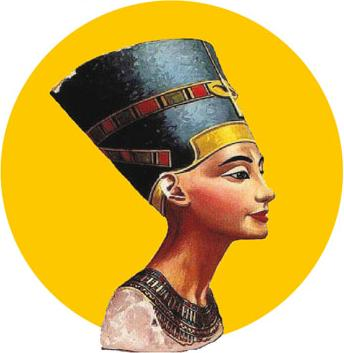
- Flag Seal
- Nickname: Bride of Upper Egypt
- Motto: Nefertiti
- Location within Egypt
- Coordinates: 28°5′16.614″N 30°45′37.663″E
- Country: Egypt
- Governorate: Minya

Area
  - Total: 15.0 km^{2} (5.8 sq mi)
- Elevation: 49 m (161 ft)

Population (2023)
  - Total: 298,021
  - Density: 19,900/km^{2} (51,500/sq mi)
- Demonym(s): Minyawi (Male, Arabic: منياوي) Minyawiyah (Female, Arabic: منياوية)
- Time zone: UTC+2 (EET)
  - Summer (DST): UTC+3 (EEST)
- Postal code: 61111
- Area code: (+20) 86

Minya (Note: Also spelled el... or al... ...Menia, ...Minia or ...Menya.) (Arabic: المنيا [elˈmenjæ]) is the capital of the Minya Governorate in Upper Egypt. It is located approximately 245 km (152 mi) south of Cairo on the western bank of the Nile River, which flows north through the city.

Minya has one of the highest concentration of Coptic Christians in Egypt (approximately 50% of total population). It is the home city of the Minya University, Suzanne Mubarak Center for Arts, the new Minya Museum, and the regional North of Upper Egypt Radio and Television.

== Etymology ==
Y5 N35 D36 X1 B6< Aa1 D43 I9 G43 > O49 X1 Z1
Mnꜥt ḫwfw
in hieroglyphs

The city's Arabic name comes from the Coptic, rendered in as ⲧⲙⲱⲛⲏ in Bohairic and ⲧⲙⲟⲟⲛⲉ in Sahidic, which in turn came from Ancient Greek: μονή, lit. 'stopping-place, station, monastery'.

The modern city of Minya is often identified with the Ancient Egyptian settlement of Men'at Khufu based on the resemblance of two names, although this claim, proposed by Gauthier and Drew-Bear, is denied by modern Egyptology as the former has a clear Greek etymology.

Minya is dubbed by the locals "Bride of Upper Egypt", in reference to its strategic location in Middle Egypt as a vital link between the north and the south of Egypt.

== History ==
=== Earliest history ===
During the Predynastic Period (before 3100 BC), the area encompassing modern day Minya and its surrounding lands formed the 16th nome (district). It remained an autonomous city-state until the ruler Menes unified Egypt around 3100 BC. At the time of its unification, Egypt was divided into 42 nomes. The 16th nome was also called the Oryx nome, probably due to the prevalence of the Oryx, one of the antelope species that inhabited the area.

=== Ancient Egyptian ===
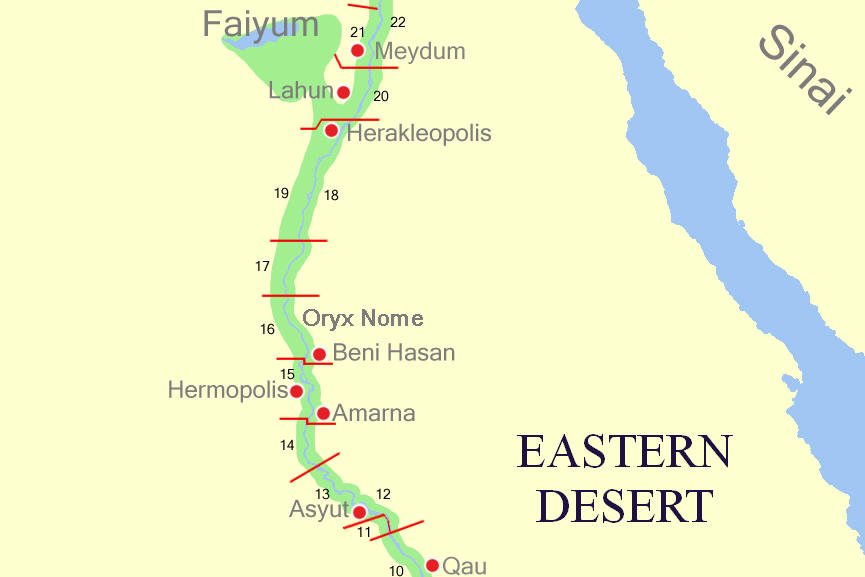
Nomes of Middle Egypt

After the unification of Egypt, the provincial capital of the 16th nome emerged as an important centre for trade. It was opposite a trade route to the Red Sea along which the Levantine traders carrying their goods from Sinai and Canaan travelled.

Following the collapse of the Old Kingdom, and during the First Intermediate Period, rulers of Oryx became wealthy and powerful and enjoyed a certain degree of autonomy in relation to the central power of Pharaohs. The princes of the nome initially remained neutral during the long struggle that dominated the First Intermediate Period between the Herakleopolitan and Theban kingdoms, but eventually during the reign of Baqet III they formed an alliance with the Thebans in the time of Mentuhotep II. This pro-Theban policy worked to their advantage in that power over the Oryx nome continued to be wielded by the same family after the Theban conquest. The power of the rulers of the Oryx nome reached its height during the 11th Dynasty.

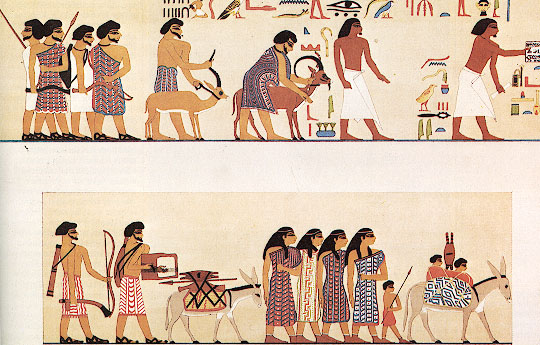
A group of Asiatic people (perhaps the future Hyksos) depicted entering Egypt c. 1900 BC from the tomb of a 12th dynasty official Khnumhotep under pharaoh Senusret II at Beni Hasan.

Like the Pharaohs, rulers of the Oryx nome were deeply concerned with their lives after death. Because the pyramid building age was over or maybe because they could not afford to construct their own pyramids, they chose the limestone cliffs of the eastern desert overlooking a gentle curve in the Nile as an ideal spot on which to carve their tombs. These chapel-tombs at Beni Hasan are the only remnant of the era. Today these thirty nine rock-cut tombs can be visited in the limestone cliffs above the modern day village of Beni Hasan. Though not as great and magnificent as other monuments of ancient Egypt, the Beni Hasan tombs are extremely important as their walls reveal more information about life in Egypt 4,000 years ago more than any other monument in Egypt. In fact these tombs provide more insight about daily life in Egypt than about the rulers who constructed them.

With the rise of the 12th Dynasty, the powers of Oryx rulers were forcibly reduced by the Pharaoh Amenemhat II (1929–1895 BC). By the end of the 12th Dynasty, the role and the power of the nome were functionally eliminated.

During the Second Intermediate Period, Oryx with the rest of Lower and Middle Egypt fell under the control of the Hyksos. It appears that Oryx's rulers actually supported the Hyksos 15th Dynasty rulers against the native Egyptian pharaohs of the 16th and 17th dynasties. Towards the end of the Second Intermediate Period when the Theban Pharaohs started their struggle to expel the Hyksos out of Egypt, Oryx nome was the site where the first major battle of this conflict took place. In 1552 BC, Kamose, the last Pharaoh of the 17th dynasty marched his Medjay troops north to Nefrusy few miles to the south of Minya and there he defeated the army of a man called Teti son of Pepi, who is said to have transformed Oryx into a "nest of the Asiatics". This was the first major defeat for the Hyksos which later would encourage Ahmose I, the younger brother of Kamose, to march north and expel the Hyksos out of Egypt for good around 1540 BC.

As for the Beni Hasan tombs, most of them were later ravaged. Some were defaced by rulers that followed. Mutilation of the tomb chamber was the fate of many monuments during the centuries following the demise of Pharaonic Egypt. Tombs were converted into dwellings, quarried as a ready source of stone, or deliberately damaged by early Christians and Muslims.

=== Greco-Roman history ===
During the Ptolemaic Era Middle Egypt was settled extensively by Greek settlers and hosted settlements with populations of 20,000 to 40,000 inhabitants. Following the Roman conquest of Egypt Minya became a hub of Egyptian cotton trade and was inhabited by Greek and Roman cotton barons and traders.

El Ashmunein (Hermopolis Magna) was the capital of the region during this period. It was the main center of worship of the god Thoth. Today, the ruins of a Greek temple, similar to the Parthenon, can be still found.

The tomb and chapel of Petosiris are found near the modern village of Tuna el-Gebel. Antinoöpolis was built in 130 A.D. by the Roman emperor Hadrian in memory of his eromenos Antinous, who drowned on the banks of the Nile river and was considered a God following Egyptian tradition. The new city was built on a long-established site and Hadrian repopulated it with Greeks from other parts of Egypt.

=== Byzantine history ===
The Monastery of the Virgin Mary at Gebel el-Teir is an important Christian site near the city of Samalut. Its church was built by Empress Helena, mother of Constantine the Great, in 328, on one of the sites where the Holy Family is believed to have stayed during its Flight into Egypt.

Oxyrhynchus was an important administrative center during the Hellenistic Period, and remains an important archaeological source for papyri from the Byzantine Egypt.

=== Islamic Era ===
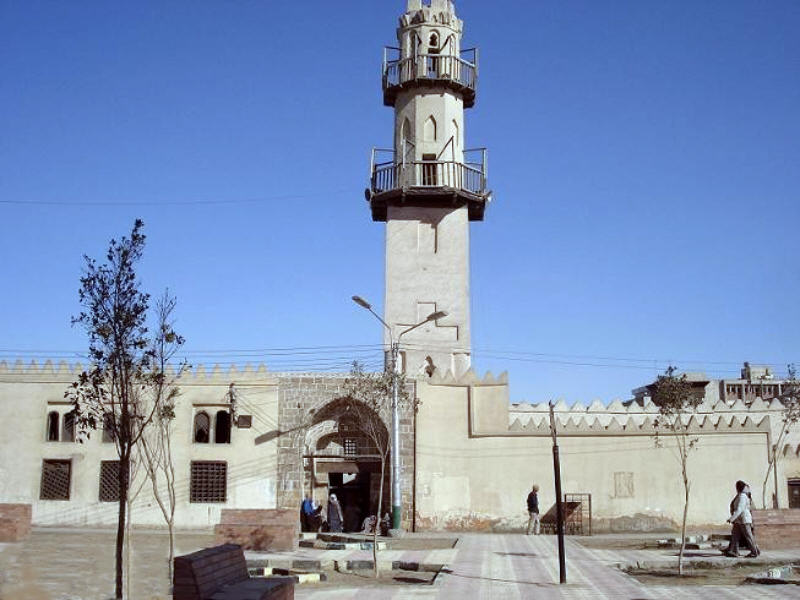
El-Amrawy Mosque, built in the 11th Century, an outstanding example of Fatimid Islamic architecture of the time, with a remarkable structural and decorative use of stonemasonry

During the rule of the Abbasids, Minya's name became attached to Ibn Khasib, the appointed benevolent and almost legendary ruler of Egypt in the early 9th century. Ibn Khasib loved Minya so much that when was asked by the Caliph to name a reward for his good deeds, he chose Minya where he would retire and die few years later. Ibn Khasib is credited for expanding Minya and transferring it from a large village to a robust Medieval city. Since Ibn Khasib years, Minya has been referred to as Munyat ibn Khasib (Ibn Khasib's Minya). During the rule of the Fatimid Caliphate in the 10th and 11th centuries, Minya continued to expand and it included large mosques, schools, a bazar, and public baths. It was during this period that two landmarks of Minya, the El-Amrawy and El-Lamaty mosques, were built. In 1326, Ibn Battuta, the famous medieval traveller, visited Minya and was impressed by what he saw there. Minya was noted and regarded with high praise in Ibn Battuta's account of his travels called The Rihla because of the school it used to have when he visited the city. Ibn Battuta's described Minya as a town that "excels all the other towns of Upper Egypt."

=== Modern history ===
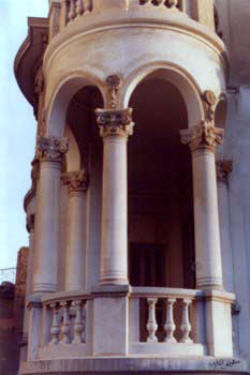
A Rococo facade of a palace in Colonial Minya

During Muhammad Ali's rule, Minya gained importance due to its fertile lands and its large agricultural production. The importance of the City increased during the reign of Ismail who owned large cotton and sugar cane plantations around Minya. Ismail constructed a royal residence in Minya and beginning with 1870 he started modernizing the city and constructed its first residential extensions. In the year 1873, the Ibrahimiya Canal was built to provide perennial irrigation to Ismail's vast lands. The canal led to a noticeable development in the urban growth especially in the western areas of the city. Improvement of the transportation network, particularly the introduction of the building of bridges across the Ibrahimiya, permitted developments of housing to grow haphazardly on private agricultural lands of the west suburban banks of the canal.

With the outbreak of the American Civil War in 1861, Egyptian cotton became an expensive commodity that was in high demand. Minya, which produced large quantities of high quality cotton benefitted from this high demand for its cottons. The influx of wealth created a new wealthy upper class that consisted of native land lords, senior officials and merchants. Confident about their status, the wealthy families took residence at what would become known later as the Colonial part of the city (the area roughly bounded by Abd el Al el Garhy Street in the south and Port Said Street in the north). There they built palaces and high-end houses that were designed by Italian architects who borrowed decorative features from Classical and Rococo architecture in addition to western-type apartment houses.

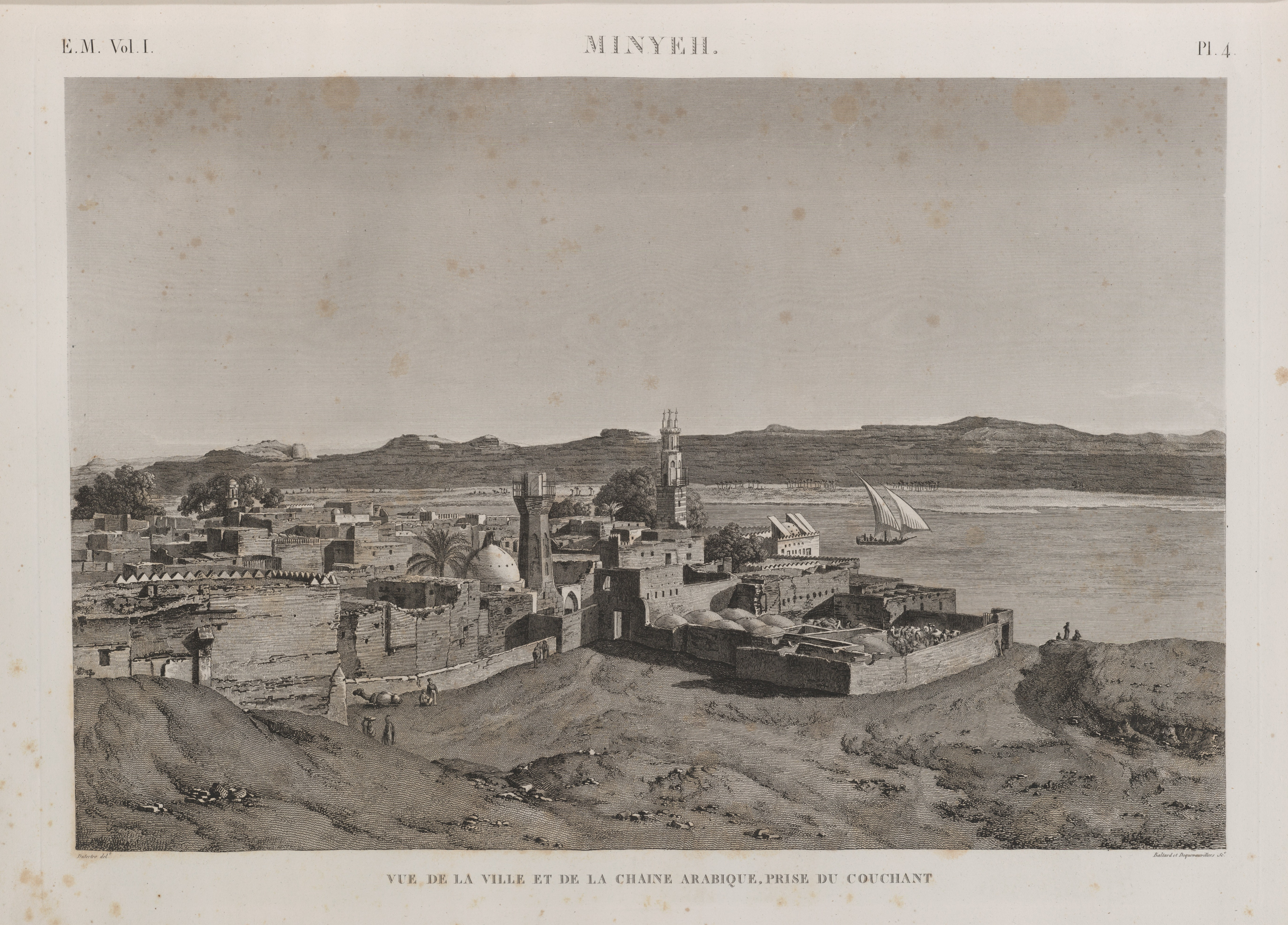
Minya in c.1800

Around the start of the 20th century, land speculations and a general building boom marked the beginning of Minya's dramatic 20th-Century expansion. In the beginning of the century, the establishment of the railway to join Cairo began. Later, the city extended east and west on the railway sides, which penetrated the current city. By that time, Great Britain established a consulate in Minya mainly to promote cotton trade. In 1907, the Ottoman Bank opened a branch in the city in recognition of its increasing economic importance. Utilities, serving mainly the new developments, were introduced under long-term franchises granted to foreign enterprises: a courthouse in 1927, the fire department in 1931, the city council and the administration building in 1937. The wide paved streets of the modern city diverted commercial activity away from the old city, hastening its deterioration.

During the Egyptian Revolution of 1919, several local independence movements briefly emerged in different parts of the country, such as the "Republic of Zefta", the "Kingdom of Farskur" and " Sultanate of Mit Ghamr" In Minya, the city declared independence under the name the "Empire of Minya." Led by Sheikh Ahmed Hatata, an Azharite judge, local notables and scholars formed a consultative council and organized a guard force of watchmen and volunteers to defend the city. A printed declaration of independence was distributed in the main square, although most copies were soon confiscated by British forces.

The movement cut railway lines leading to Minya, disrupting communications, supplies, and newspapers from Cairo. In response, British authorities dispatched military forces under Brigadier General Huddleston, supported by Egyptian officers. When troops were ordered to fire on demonstrators, many refused, and violent clashes followed in which the local commander, Major Shahin, was killed. Reinforcements with artillery were then brought in, and the British recaptured the city after heavy fighting. Several leaders, including Sheikh Ahmed Hatata, were arrested and tried before a military court on 15 April 1919, but were later released after negotiations.

Following the revolution of 1952, the Suez Crisis of 1956 and the subsequent nationalization of many industries from 1957, the vast majority of the Greek and Armenian communities of Minya left Egypt. This led to the beginning of the decline for the colonial district. During this period, the internal population movements further accentuated disparities between the two parts of the city: the old city with its legacy of obsolescence and poverty, and the colonial district with its modern buildings and services. Densities continued to increase in the old city, where there were inadequate community facilities. The resultant overcrowding accelerated deterioration of both infrastructure and the standing housing stock.

In the 1960s, Ard Al-Mowled was developed as a public housing scheme to accommodate the exploding population growth of lower income residents of the old city. Around the beginning of the 1970s, the modern district of Ard Sultan began to be established according to land subdivision and zoning laws. Because of the high land price in the area, it attracted upper and middle-income groups who left the deteriorating colonial city. Ard Sultan was carved in by a number of new urban corridor streets, which were complemented by a system of perpendicular and circular roads. These main new axes are parallel to the Nile River and bordered by freestanding buildings with heights of up to 30 metres. The north–south access of Taha Hussein Street formed a new linear central area that was intended to represent modern Minya.

=== Archaeology ===
The Gnostic Codex Tchacos, noted for containing the Gospel of Judas, was discovered near Minya during the 1970s beside three ancient books in a limestone box.

In February 2019, fifty mummy collections wrapped in linen, stone coffins or wooden sarcophagi dated back to the Ptolemaic Kingdom were discovered by Egyptian archaeologists in the Tuna El-Gebel site. 12 of the graves in four burial chambers 9 m (30 ft) deep, belonged to children. One of the remains was the partly uncovered skull enclosed in linen. Egypt's Minister of Tourism and Antiquities announced the discovery of the collective graves of senior officials and high clergies of the god Djehuty (Thoth) in Tuna el-Gebel in January, 2020. An archaeological mission headed by Mustafa Waziri reported that 20 sarcophagi and coffins of various shapes and sizes, including five sarcophagi made of limestone and carved with hieroglyphic texts, as well as 16 tombs and five well-preserved wooden coffins were unearthed by their team.

In May 2020, an Egyptian-Spanish archaeological mission, led by Esther Ponce, uncovered a unique cemetery dating to the 26th Dynasty (so-called the El-Sawi era) at the site of ancient Oxyrhynchus. Archaeologists found tombstones, bronze coins, small crosses, and clay seals inside eight Roman-era tombs with domed and unmarked roofs.

== Economy ==
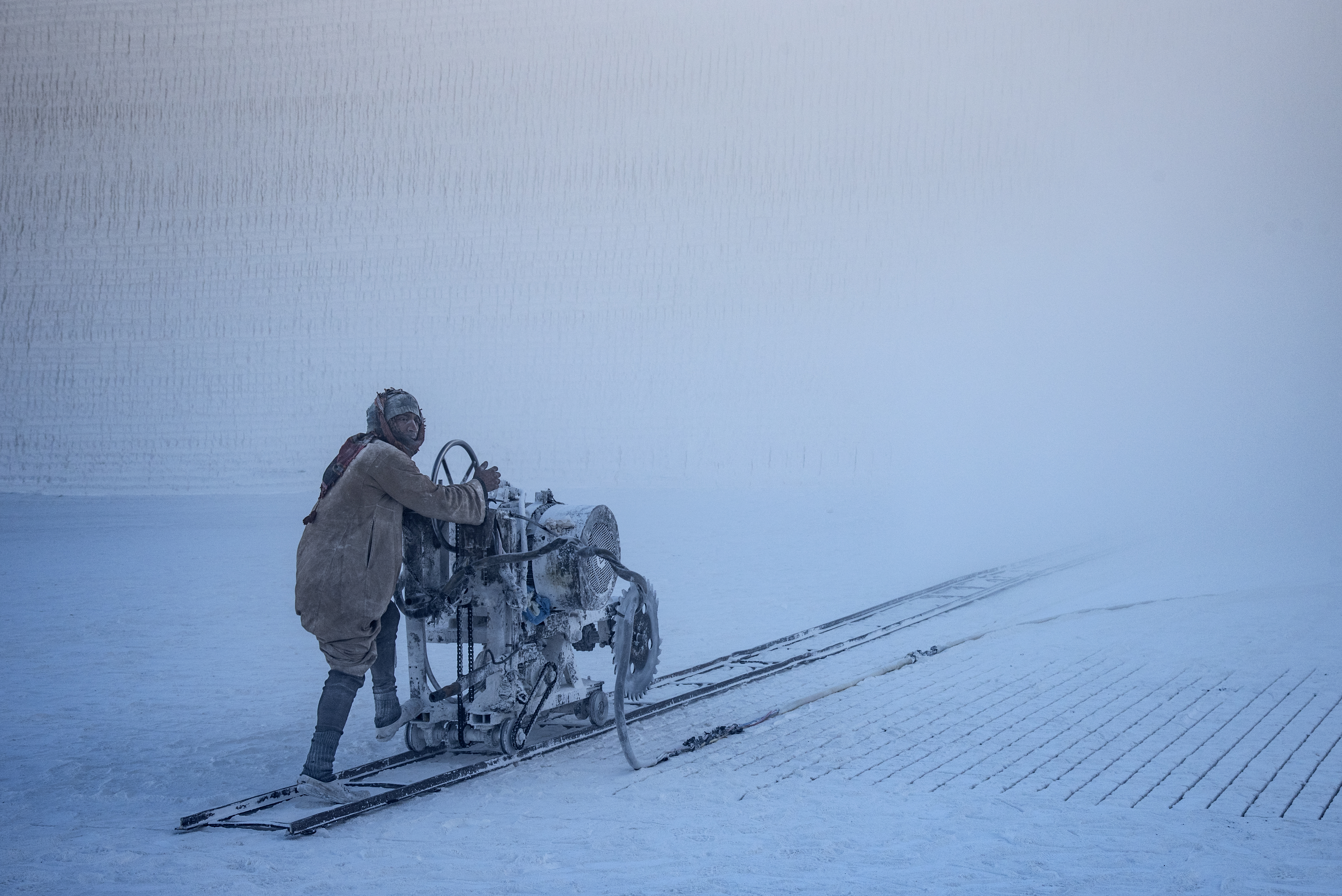
Limestone quarry

The public sector predominates in industry, controlling most of the production of capital and intermediate goods. Among the state-run industries are cement, chemicals, mining, fertilizers and agricultural industries. The private sector is active in manufacturing of consumer goods, particularly in small enterprises in and around the city. The principal private industries are food products, furniture, and metal and woodworking. Although rich in history, tourism plays a trivial role in the economy of Minya.

== Climate ==
Köppen-Geiger climate classification system classifies its climate as hot desert (BWh). Luxor, Minya, Sohag, Qena and Asyut have the widest difference of temperatures between days and nights of any city in Egypt, with almost 16 °C (29 °F) difference. The city of Minya is located tightly between two ranges of about 500 m (1,600 ft)-mountains on both western and eastern sides, and falls away from the Mediterranean Sea and the Red Sea, thus giving the city a significant temperature difference between summer and winter.

During summertime, temperatures could reach 40 °C (104 °F), while winter in Minya sees temperatures drop to below 0 °C (32 °F) levels at night. While hail or snow are extremely rare due to Minya's low precipitation averages, frost will occasionally form on cold winter nights. The average annual rainfall in Minya is 5.3 mm (0.21 in).

Climate data for Minya (1991–2020)
Month	Jan	Feb	Mar	Apr	May	Jun	Jul	Aug	Sep	Oct	Nov	Dec	Year
Record high °C (°F)	30.7 (87.3)	33.8 (92.8)	41.4 (106.5)	45.2 (113.4)	48.0 (118.4)	47.5 (117.5)	43.6 (110.5)	44.6 (112.3)	43.4 (110.1)	42.0 (107.6)	37.6 (99.7)	31.0 (87.8)	48.0 (118.4)
Mean daily maximum °C (°F)	20.3 (68.5)	22.1 (71.8)	25.6 (78.1)	30.6 (87.1)	34.7 (94.5)	36.8 (98.2)	37.0 (98.6)	36.9 (98.4)	35.4 (95.7)	31.4 (88.5)	26.0 (78.8)	21.4 (70.5)	29.9 (85.7)
Daily mean °C (°F)	12.5 (54.5)	14.1 (57.4)	17.5 (63.5)	22.0 (71.6)	26.6 (79.9)	29.2 (84.6)	29.7 (85.5)	29.6 (85.3)	28.0 (82.4)	24.1 (75.4)	18.4 (65.1)	13.7 (56.7)	22.1 (71.8)
Mean daily minimum °C (°F)	5.5 (41.9)	6.6 (43.9)	9.6 (49.3)	13.5 (56.3)	18.1 (64.6)	21.0 (69.8)	22.2 (72.0)	22.4 (72.3)	20.9 (69.6)	17.4 (63.3)	11.8 (53.2)	7.1 (44.8)	14.7 (58.4)
Record low °C (°F)	−3.4 (25.9)	−0.3 (31.5)	1.0 (33.8)	4.5 (40.1)	9.0 (48.2)	14.3 (57.7)	16.0 (60.8)	16.2 (61.2)	13.5 (56.3)	10.0 (50.0)	3.0 (37.4)	−0.8 (30.6)	−3.4 (25.9)
Average precipitation mm (inches)	0.68 (0.03)	0.75 (0.03)	0.83 (0.03)	0.03 (0.00)	0.14 (0.01)	0 (0)	0 (0)	0 (0)	0 (0)	0 (0)	0.21 (0.01)	0.18 (0.01)	2.82 (0.12)
Average precipitation days (≥ 1.0 mm)	0.23	0.38	0.27	0	0.04	0	0	0	0	0	0.08	0.08	1.08
Average relative humidity (%)	63	56	52	43	37	40	46	51	53	55	61	67	52
Average dew point °C (°F)	4.1 (39.4)	4.0 (39.2)	5.7 (42.3)	6.9 (44.4)	8.5 (47.3)	12.1 (53.8)	15.2 (59.4)	16.4 (61.5)	15.0 (59.0)	12.5 (54.5)	10.1 (50.2)	6.2 (43.2)	9.7 (49.5)
Mean monthly sunshine hours	251.5	253.4	283.8	304.2	339.1	367.2	382.0	363.3	315.9	309.4	260.9	235.7	3,666.4
Source: NOAA (humidity, dew point, records 1961–1990)

== Notable people ==
- Hoda Shaarawi (June 23, 1879 – December 12, 1947), a pioneer Egyptian feminist leader and nationalist
- Taha Hussein (15 November 1889 – 28 October 1973), a figurehead for the Arab Renaissance and the modernist movement in the Arab World
- Shadi Abdel Salam (15 March 1930 – 8 October 1986), Egyptian film maker, best known for "The Night of Counting the Years" (Al-Momiaa)
- Tawhida Abdel-Rahman (30 November 1906 – 10 September 1974), Egyptian doctor
- Suzanne Mubarak (born 28 February 1941), Egypt's First Lady (1981–2011)
- Ramses Younan (1913 - 1966), Egyptian surrealist artist and thinker
- Antonios Naguib (born 1935), Patriarch emeritus of the Coptic Catholic Church
- Mahmoud Abouelleil (born 24 December 1935), Judge and a former Minister of Justice of Egypt
- Ammar El Sherei (born 16 April 1948), famous Egyptian music composer
- Mervat Amin (born 24 November 1948), famous Egyptian actress
- Rafik Habib (born 1959), Christian (Coptic) Egyptian researcher, activist, author, and politician.
- Safaa Fathy (born 7 July 1958), Egyptian poet, essayist and documentary filmmaker
- Akram Habib (born 3 July 1965), Biblical scholar and social activist

== Sister cities ==
- Hildesheim, Germany (1979)

== See also ==
- List of cities and towns in Egypt
