= Mahmoud Abouelleil =

Egyptian politician (1935–2011)

Mahmoud Abouelleil (1935–2011) was Minister of Justice of the Arab Republic of Egypt from July 2004 until his resignation in August 2006. He was governor of Giza from 2000 till 2004, and Kafr-El-Sheikh from 1996 till 2000.

== Early life ==
Abouelleil was born in El-Minia on 24 December 1935 to a father engaged in journalism. He moved to Cairo in the early 1950s and after completing high school at Al-Ibrahimiyya school, he enrolled in 1954 into the faculty of Law, Cairo University, graduating in 1958.

== Career ==
He was appointed assistant to the public prosecutor and later became head of the Cairo Appeal's court and the Cairo and Giza Criminal and National Security court. He served as Chief Justice of the Giza Primary Court from 1992 till 1996.

=== Governor ===
He served as governor of Kafr-El-Sheikh from 1996-2000 and of Giza from 2000-2004. He supported projects to improve infrastructure and public services and the development of industrial areas, as well as to encourage investment in Kafr-el-Sheikh and Giza. He also spotlighted the Bahariya Oasis region. These efforts culminated in the presidential decision to allocate 20,000 feddan for agricultural, industrial and tourism development in accordance with environmental considerations.

=== Minister of Justice ===
Abouelleil served as Minister of Justice for the country from 2004-2006. Several important events occurred during the period. Presidential elections took place for the first time in the history of Egypt. This occurred in the midst of changes to the constitution and other fundamental political laws. In particular, the "Judiciary Power Law" that had been demanded by judges for over twenty years, emerged in the form of amendments in favour of judicial independence. Law no. 47, which deals with regulation of the media was amended to provide new guarantees for freedom of expression on 15 July 2006.

Abouelleil oversaw the parliamentary elections in 2005. He headed the electoral committee in which in the first stage of the elections witnessed an unprecedented success of independent candidates. Before the elections Abouelleil issued a statement guaranteeing that the judicial observation of the elections would be comprehensive and impartial.

This did not continue in the second and third stages and produced a crisis between the judges and the state. The judges demanded independence from the state, and a guarantee of fair and impartial elections. Abouelleil sided with the judges and in an historic publication on 8 June 2005 he declared his support of an independent judiciary. During this time, the ministry continued to support judge groups across the country, providing subsidised health care and financial support to the groups in Cairo, Alexandria and surrounding districts. The crisis continued throughout Abouelleil's Ministry. The crisis led to his resignation while continuing to support judicial independence. His resignation was accepted and the president decided to honour him with the Republican Medal of the First Degree, one of Egypt's highest honours. Abouelleil died in London on 27 September 2011.

== Personal life ==
Mahmoud Abouelleil married Nadia Abdelaziz in 1968. They had three children.
