= First Picture =

- Directed by: Akram Al-Ashqar
- Written by: Akram Al-Ashqar
- Produced by: AIF
- Cinematography: Akram Al-Ashqar
- Edited by: Akram Al-Ashqar
- Release date: December 1, 2006
- Running time: 27 minutes
- Country: Palestine
- Language: Arabic Hebrew

First Picture (2006) is a documentary film by Akram Al-Ashqar. It was shown at the Copenhagen International Film Festival on 15 November 2007, It follows the story of a Palestinian child from Tulkarm Camp for the Palestinian refugees. Born in one of the Israeli prisons, he spent more than two and a half years there. Then, he was separated from his mother who is still remaining arrested in prison by the Israeli Authorities, the moment when the child starts an adventure of discovering the natural life under the protection of his father and family and the companions of the released prisoner mates of his mother, being still very affected by the memories of his experience in prison.
