= Spôjmaï Zariâb =

Afghan-born short story writer (born 1949)

Spôjmaï Raouf Zariâb (Farsi dari: سپوژمی زریاب; born 1949, some sources say 1952) is an Afghan-born short story writer. Her name also appears as Spozhmai Zaryab, and surname appears as Zaryab.

== Biography ==
She was born in Kabul and was educated at Kabul University, at the École des Beaux-Arts in Kabul and at Besançon in France. She married Rahnaward Zaryab, also a writer. During the Soviet occupation of her country, she worked as a translator at the French embassy. In 1991, she left Afghanistan for exile at Montpellier in France.

Her works appeared in newspapers and magazines in Afghanistan before the Afghan civil war and in Iran. Zariâb writes in Persian.

Zariâb was one of the first modern Afghan writers to have her works translated into French. The following works have appeared in translation:

- Ces murs qui nous écoutent (2000)
- La plaine de Caïn (1988, 2001)
- Dessine-moi un coq (2003)
- Les demeures sans nom (2010)

Some of her stories have appeared in translation in the UNESCO Courier:

- Babylon reconquered (2009)
- The man from Kabul (2008)
