= Akram Pedramnia =

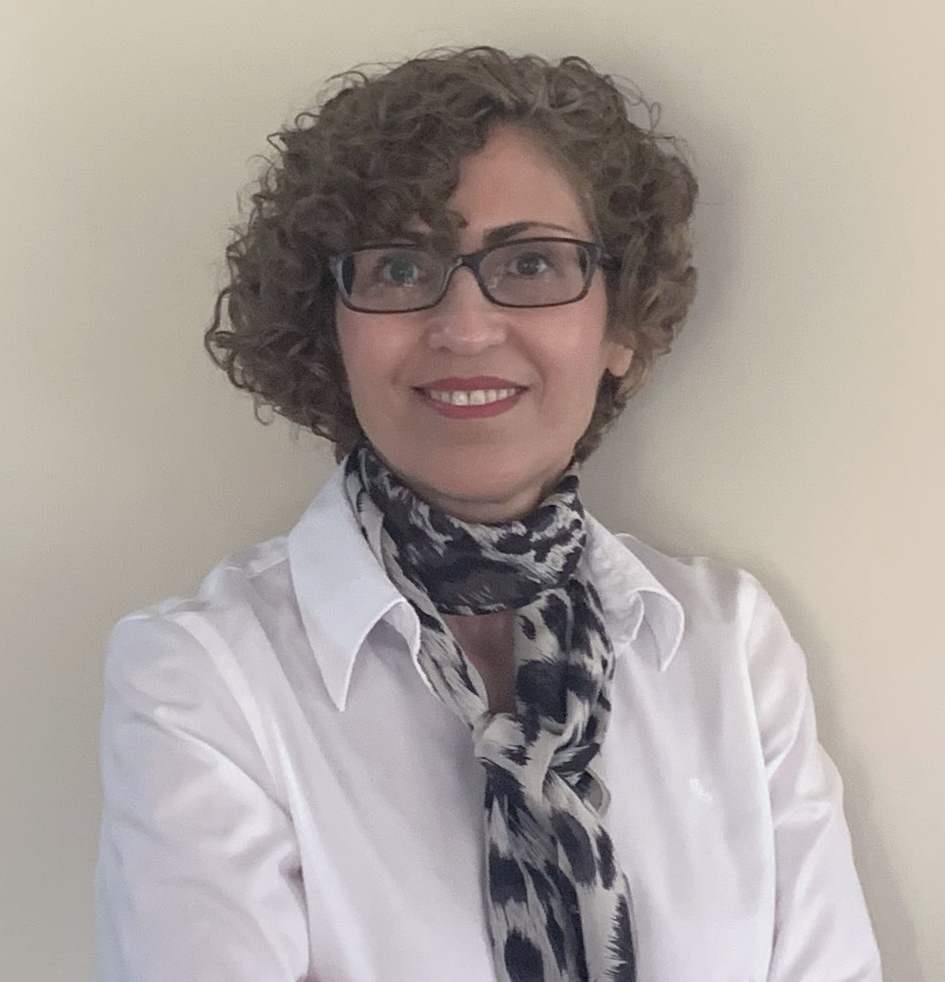
- Born: February 17, 1969 (age 57); Iran
- Citizenship: Iran, Canada
- Occupations: Writer, researcher, translator, joycean scholar and physician
- Website: pedramnia.com

Akram Pedramnia (Persian: اکرم پدرام‌نیا) (February 17, 1969) is an Iranian-Canadian writer, translator, Joycean scholar, researcher, activist, and physician. She has written, researched, and translated many English novels and political articles. She has resided in Canada since 1998, when she emigrated from Iran.

== Biography ==
Born and raised to a working-class family in Kashan, Pedramnia studied English literacy at the University of Tehran. She was admitted then to Iran University of Medical Sciences and graduated as a physician in 1997. In Canada, she obtained a Health informatics degree from McMaster University.

She is currently writing and translating about various matters, including novels, literature critics, and social issues. Pedramnia has also frequently written for international Iranian newspapers and websites.

== Books ==
She is the author of three novels in the Persian language, نفیر کویر (Nefir Desert) in 2010 ISBN 978-6-001-19048-3, زیگورات (Ziggurat) in 2011 ISBN 978-6-001-19353-8, and زمستان تپه‌های سوما (Winter on the Soma Hills), on themes which reveal underlying social issues in Iran.

She was featured in one chapter of the book, Iranian Immigrants to Canada: Zahra Kazemi, Nazanin Afshin-Jam, Marina Nemat, Amir Khadir, Pedram Moallemian, Akram Pedramnia, Roxana Moslehi, 2010 ISBN 978-1-155-67183-3

She has also translated into Persian texts by various authors such as Colm Tóibín, E. L. Doctorow, Naomi Klein, Joan London (Gilgamesh), Noam Chomsky (Failed States: The Abuse of Power and the Assault on Democracy), Richard B. Wright (Clara Callan), F. Scott Fitzgerald (Tender Is the Night, 2009), Vladimir Nabokov (Lolita, 2014) and James Joyce (Ulysses). A translation of Margaret Atwood's Alias Grace had not been published as of January 2019, as, according to Pedramnia, the publishers had requested cuts which she did not agree to.

She received a scholarship to research at the James Joyce Foundation in Zurich, to aid her translation of Akram, Pedramnia (2019). "'Pleasure or pain, is it?': Translating Ulysses into Persian". Dublin James Joyce Journal. 10 (10): 9–21. doi:10.1353/djj.2017.0001. S2CID 150831770..

== Activism on censorship ==
Pedramnia is best known for challenging and criticizing Iranian censorship opposing freedom of speech and expression of writers and artists. In 2013 she translated Vladimir Nabokov's Lolita into Persian, almost sixty years after its only other Persian translation. The book was published in Afghanistan, another Persian language speaking nation and Iran's neighboring country, by a Kabul-based publisher named Zaryab Publication. Soon after, Lolita found its way to the Iranian underground market. In response, the Iranian Minister of Cultural and Islamic Guidance declared that Pedramnia's translation is banned and has been disseminated illegally. The book was later published in a different format as samizdat inside Iran. Due to the same argument, her recent work, the translation of James Joyce's Ulysses, another forbidden book, has been planned for publication in six volumes by Nogaam Press, a Persian-language publisher based in London, England which aims to publish Persian writing and translation beyond the censorship concerns faced inside the country. The first volume was released in April 2019.

An article in The Globe and Mail describes her as "one of the strongest-willed translators active today. Confronting pernicious state-sponsored censorship, watching as dubious publishers eight time zones away put her work into print without permission or payment."

The Italian newspaper, Il Foglio writes: "This (Lolita) is my translation sold on the streets of Tehran," says Akram Pedramnia at this week's The Boston Globe. "The book is forbidden, but people send me these photographs, hiding their faces, of course. And they publish these images on social platforms, showing smuggling".

A German-language newspaper Neue Zürcher Zeitung says: “Her translations are distributed as pirated or over the Internet without her earning a cent – but that does not bother Akram Pedramnia. She is even pleased. Thanks to her, Iranian readers can read Lolita or Tender Is the Night".

== Awards ==
- Scholarship: James Joyce Foundation, Zurich, 2019
- Translation Grant: Literature Ireland for Persian translation of Ulysses

Essays and lectures

- James Joyce Symposium, Antwerp, 2018 (Lecture)
- University College Dublin, Summer, 2018 (Lecture)
- James Joyce Foundation, Zurich, 2019 (Lecture)
- James Joyce Symposium, Mexico City, 2019 (Lecture)
- Dublin James Joyce Journal, 2017 (Essay)
- Free University of Berlin Bulletin, 2019 (Essay)
