= Akram Fahimian =

Iranian poet

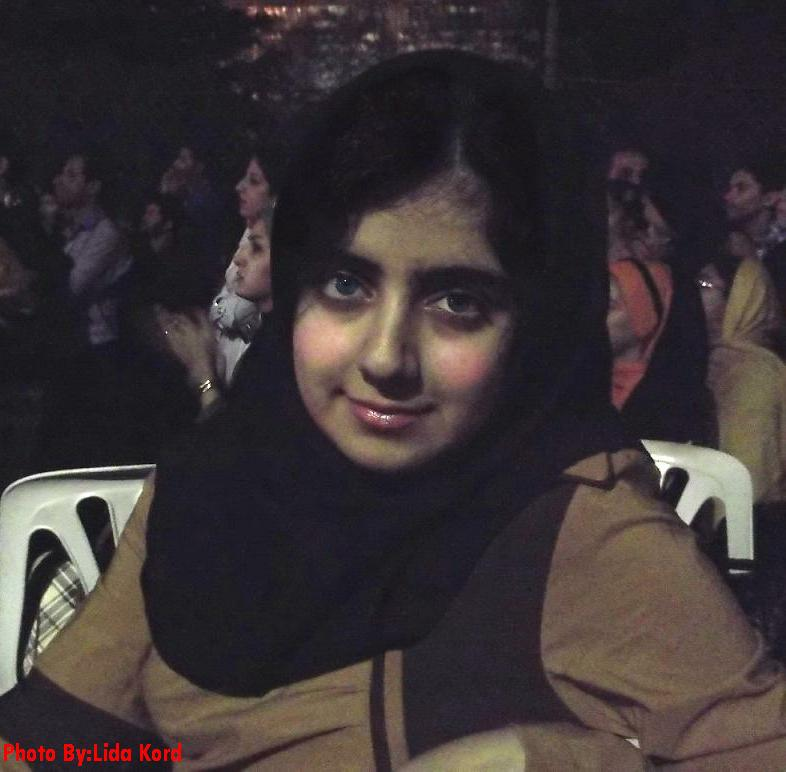
- Born: 7 December 1990 (age 34); Mazandaran, Iran
- Occupation(s): Poet, photographer, designer

Akram Fahimian (Persian: اکرم فهیمیان, born 17 December 1990) is an Iranian poet who has gained success inside of Iran. She began writing poetry when she was sixteen, frequently winning awards at poetry festivals. She is also a photographer. She created a wiki for artists, Artists Database, in 2013 at the age of 23.

== Awards ==
- Chosen in festival poetry students - 2007
- Candidate from Poetry Festival "expected" - 2010
- Chosen in festival for the poem "Prayer" - 2010
- Candidate in festival for the poem "Defence" - 2011
- Chosen in festival for the poem "Bharnarnj" - 2012
- Chosen in festival for the poem "Bharnarnj" - 2013
- Chosen in festival for the poem "Palm and Olive Graft" - 2014
