= Selma Ekrem =

Turkish-American writer

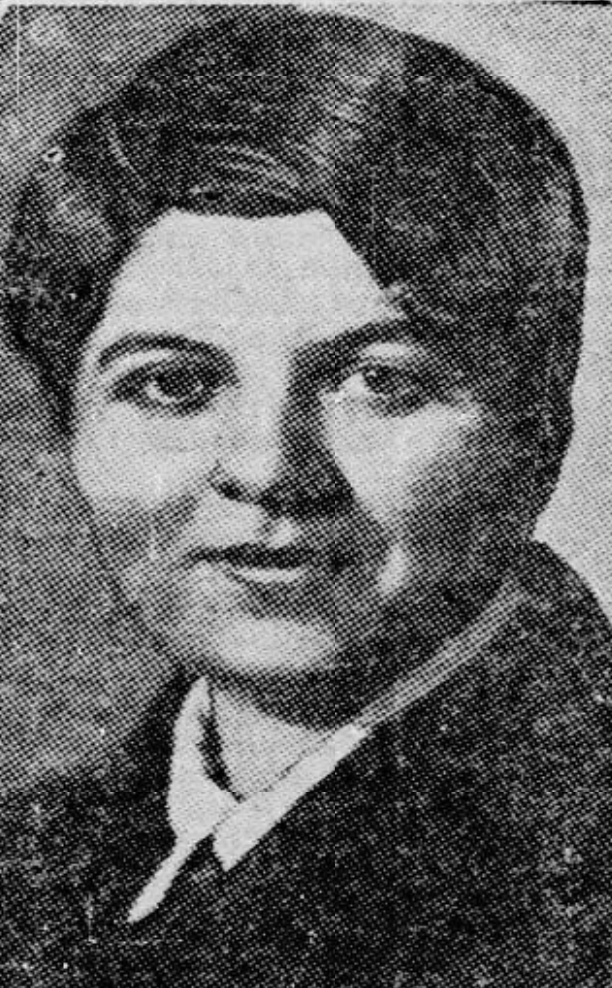
- Selma Ekrem, from a 1927 newspaper
- Born: August 23, 1902; Istanbul, Türkiye
- Died: June 7, 1986 (age 83); Manomet, Massachusetts, U.S.
- Other names: Hadije Selma Ekrem, Hatice Selma Bulayir
- Father: Ali Ekrem Bolayır
- Relatives: Namik Kemal (grandfather)

Hadije Selma Ekrem Bulayir (August 23, 1902 – June 7, 1986) was a Turkish-American writer and lecturer. She published hundreds of essays in The Christian Science Monitor between 1942 and 1973; her books included a memoir and a book of Turkish folk tales for children.

== Early life and education ==
Ekrem was born in Istanbul, the daughter of Ali Ekrem Bolayır. Her father was the Ottoman governor general of Jerusalem from 1906 to 1908, and governor general of the Greek Archipelago Islands from 1908 to 1910; he also taught literature at Istanbul University. Her grandfather was poet Namik Kemal. Her family was Muslim. She graduated from the American College for Girls in Istanbul.

== Career ==
Ekrem first visited the United States in 1924, when she spoke at a meeting of the American Association of University Women (AAUW). She lectured throughout the United States and Canada, especially in the 1920s and 1930s, about Turkey and about women's lives in the Middle East. She spoke at the World Conference of Women in Chicago in 1933. In 1940 she spoke in Portland, Oregon and in Los Angeles, and in 1941 she addressed audiences in Fresno and Santa Barbara, California. In 1942 she spoke about World War II in San Bernardino and Stockton, California.

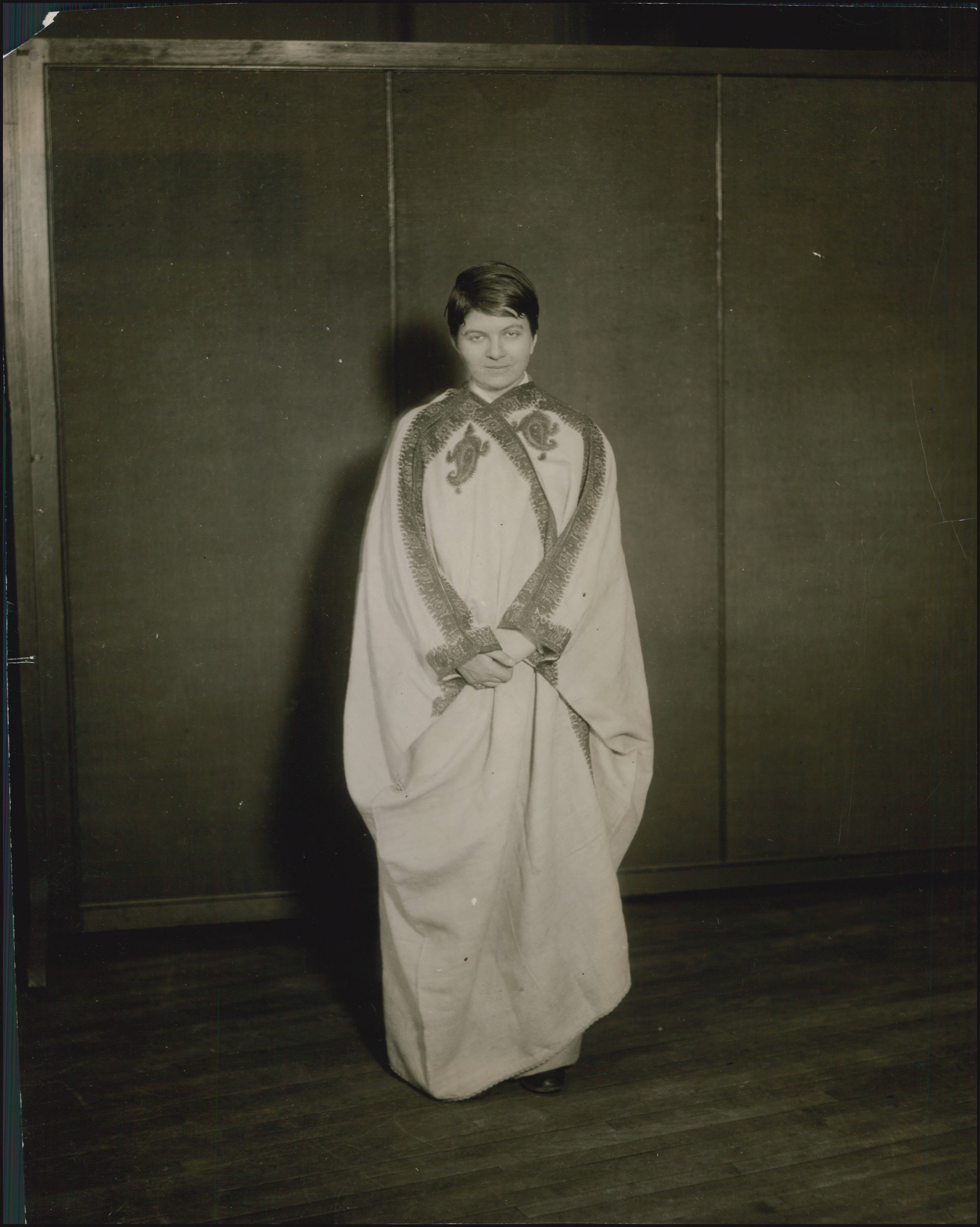
Ekrem, wearing the mashlah, the camel hair robe trimmed in Turkish embroidery in which she appeared when she spoke before members of the Woman's club.

== Publications ==
Ekrem published a memoir in 1930, and a book about Turkey in 1947. She wrote almost 300 essays for the Christian Science Monitor between 1942 and 1973. She also wrote a book of Turkish fairy tales, published in 1964.

- Unveiled: The Autobiography of a Turkish Girl (1930, reprinted 2005)
- Turkey Old and New (1947)
- "The Stone Hearth Ovens of Istanbul" (1956)
- Turkish Fairy Tales (1964)

== Personal life ==
Ekrem was described in 1929 as having "boyish bob" and a "boyish swagger". Another headline called her a "Turkish flapper". She kept her hair short, and she wore tailored jackets, shirts, trousers, hats and neckties. She also smoked cigarettes. In 1940 and 1950 she lived with her friend Elizabeth Anderson in New Canaan, Connecticut. She died in 1986, at the age of 83, in Manomet, Massachusetts. Her 1930 memoir was reprinted in 2005.
