= Ekrem Ibrić =

Yugoslav footballer

Personal information
- Full name: Ekrem Ibrić
- Date of birth: January 25, 1962 (age 64)
- Place of birth: Srebrenik, SFR Yugoslavia
- Position: Defender

Senior career*
Years	Team	Apps	(Gls)
1982–1991	Sloboda Tuzla	146	(5)
- * Club domestic league appearances and goals

Ekrem Ibrić (born 25 January 1962, in Srebrenik) is a former Yugoslav football player, from the 1980s. Currently, he is Sloboda Tuzla's secretary.

== Career ==
Ibrić played several seasons in the Yugoslav First League with Sloboda Tuzla.
