= Akram Habib =

Egyptian-British scholar

- Born: Akram Habib Matta; 3 July 1965 (age 61); Minya, Egypt
- Education: Cairo University (B.S.); University of Sussex (M.S.)
- Years active: 1992–present

Akram Habib is a Coptic Egyptian-British biblical scholar, pracademic, social activist and human rights advocate. He is best known for his biblical exegesis Arabic TV programme Words of Prophecy on Alhorreya channel which is concerned with literal, allegorical and mystical hermeneutics of biblical prophecies specifically related to the Christian eschatological doctrine of the Second Coming of Jesus Christ in an academic method, usually by referring to the original texts of the Old Testament and the New Testament of the Bible in various manuscripts and Bible concordances such as Strong's Concordance in comparison with modern Arabic and English Bible translations and to the commentaries of the early Church Fathers before the 4th century AD.
