= Ekrem Kahya =

Dutch footballer and manager

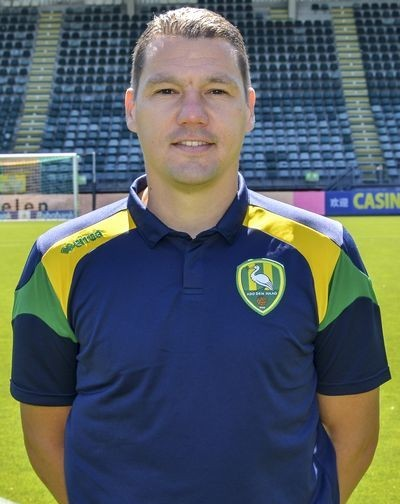

Personal information
- Date of birth: 9 February 1978 (age 48)
- Place of birth: The Hague, Netherlands
- Position: Midfielder

Team information
- Current team: ADO Den Haag (assistant)

Youth career
- Dynamo'67
- ADO Den Haag

Senior career*
Years	Team	Apps	(Gls)
1996–2002	ADO Den Haag	119	(1)
2002–2003	Denizlispor	1	(0)
2003–2004	Go Ahead Eagles	33	(1)
2004–2006	FC Dordrecht	47	(5)
2006–2008	VVV-Venlo	47	(2)
2008–2009	ADO Den Haag	10	(0)
2009–2012	HBS Craeyenhout		

Managerial career
- 2012–2014: ADO Den Haag (U19)
- 2014–: ADO Den Haag (assistant)
- 2017: ADO Den Haag (caretaker)
- * Club domestic league appearances and goals

Ekrem Kahya (born 9 February 1978) is a Dutch football manager and former professional footballer. After beginning his professional career in 1996 with ADO Den Haag, he has since played for Denizlispor, Go Ahead Eagles, FC Dordrecht and VVV-Venlo. He re-signed for ADO Den Haag during the 2008–09 season. He played as a center midfielder.
