= Ikram =

Ikram is a unisex given name and surname.

== Surname ==
- Aamir Ikram (born 1960), Pakistani cricketer
- Muhammed Ikram (born 1988), Pakistani footballer
- Nassar Ikram SI(M), an active two-star ranked Pakistan's Naval official
- S. M. Ikram (1908–1973), Pakistani historian
- Salima Ikram (born 1965), professor of Egyptology at the American University in Cairo
- Tan Ikram, district judge
- Zied Ayet Ikram (born 1988), amateur Tunisian Greco-Roman wrestler

== Given name ==
- Ikram Akhtar (born 1970), Indian film writer
- Ikram Antaki (1948–2000), female Syrian-Mexican writer
- Ikrom Berdiev, Uzbekistani boxer
- Ikram Butt (born 1968), English professional rugby league footballer
- Ikram Dinçer (born 1959), Turkish politician
- Ikram Elahi (born 1933), former Pakistani cricketer
- Ikram Rabbani, former Pakistani cricket umpire
- Ikram Kerwat, Tunisian-German boxer
- Ikram Sehgal, defense analyst and security expert
- Ikram Yakubov, former intelligence officer of Uzbekistan

== Similar name ==
- Iqram Dinzly (born 1981), a Malaysian actor, model and television host

== See also ==
- Ikramullah (disambiguation)
