= Akram Khuzam =

Russian television journalist

Akram Khuzam (Arabic: أكرم خزام) was the Al Jazeera Channel's former Moscow Bureau chief. He served as the Bureau Chief in Moscow for 9 years until he was replaced in a storm of controversy by Amro Abdel-Hamid in late September 2005. Khuzam was known for ending his reports by saying "...Akram Khuzam, Aljazeera, Moscooowww."

== Anti-Muslim statements ==
Akram Khuzam angered the Muslim community in Russia in 2004 by making anti-Muslim statements. He declared to a Russian TV channel that Islam promotes terrorism and that the Qur'an incite violence, and he said that three of the Muslim Caliphs were killed in internal terrorist conflicts. Mr. Geidar Dzhemal, the head of the Islamic Committee of Russia, asked Al Jazeera to fire Mr. Khuzam. Al Jazeera stated that the replacement of Akram Khuzam in September 2005 was not related to the complaints raised by the Islamic Committee and was unrelated to Mr Khuzam's statements.

== Replacement as Moscow Bureau Chief ==
On the 20 September 2005 the news broke that Akram Khuzam was being replaced as the AlJazeera Moscow Bureau Chief. Initial reports incorrectly indicated that Mr. Khuzam had been fired but the Arabic site Akhbaruna confirmed that Mr. Khuzam had just been moved into a different role.

It emerged that Al Jazeera had been concerned about the way the former Soviet bloc was being covered and wanted to invigorate its coverage by recruiting the widely acclaimed Russian Arab journalist Amro Abdel-Hamid to replace Akram Khuzam. Mr. Abdel-Hamid was formerly the head of the Al-Arabiya office in Moscow before joining Al Jazeera.
