= Ekram (film) =

2018 film

- Directed by: Saheem Khan
- Written by: Shamael Khan
- Starring: Saheem Khan; Sakshi Lathaik
- Edited by: Miraj Ali
- Music by: Aslam Keyi
- Release date: November 2018 (Creation International Film Festival)
- Running time: 95 minutes
- Country: India
- Language: Hindi

Ekram (transl. इकराम) is an Indian Bollywood drama film, written and directed by Saheem Khan.

== Cast ==
- Saheem Khan as Ekram Siddiqui
- Sakshi lathaik as Nafeesha
- Asit Redij as Officer Randeep Singh
- Arshad Khan
- Sharat Sonu as Ishtiyaq Siddiqui

== Plot ==
The film is about a young college student who is picked up by a police team during a tense situation following a terrorist attack in the capital Delhi. The film revolves around the life of this young man named Ekram Siddiqui, when he is convicted for a terrorist attack and kept in jail for ten years before being acquitted in court.

== Production ==
This film has been shot in Delhi, Mumbai and Aligarh in Uttar Pradesh (India).

== Soundtrack ==
Ekram

Soundtrack album by Master Saleem
- Released: 27 February 2020
- Recorded: 2019–2020
- Genre: Feature film soundtrack
- Length: 10:19
- Language: Hindi
- Label: MX Player
External audio
- Video on YouTube

The music of the film is composed by Aslam Keyi and sung by singers like Master Saleem, Altamash Faridi and Mohammad Imran Pratapgarhi.

No.	Title	Lyrics	Music	Singer(s)	Length
1.	"Sazaa Hai Kis Gunah Ki" (Hindi)	Sagar Ilyas	Aslam Keyi	Master Saleem	03:25
2.	"Rab Ishq Da" (Hindi)	Sagar Ilyas	Aslam keyi	Altamash Faridi	04:48
3.	"Suna Tha Ki Behad" (Hindi)	Mohammad Imran Pratapgarhi	Not exist	Mohammad Imran Pratapgarhi	02:06
Total length:					10:19

== Release ==
The film is going to be released in India in coming month of 2020, but unreleased.
