= Nawaal Akram =

Qatari comedian, model, athlete and disability rights campaigner

- Born: 1998 or 1999 (age 26–27); Doha, Qatar
- Occupations: Comedian, model, athlete, disability rights campaigner
- Known for: Protecting the right to education

Nawaal Akram (Arabic: نوال أكرم) is a Qatari comedian, model, athlete and disability rights campaigner. She was diagnosed with Duchenne muscular dystrophy at the age of six, and was forcefully removed from education against her wishes at the age of 10 by the school; she became a wheelchair user at the age of 12. She has since founded Muscular Dystrophy Qatar to raise awareness of the condition, and was named one of BBC's 100 Women programme in 2017.

== Career ==
Born in Doha, Qatar, to Pakistani parents, Nawaal Akram is one of six children to Mohammed and Saima Akram. At the age of six, she was diagnosed with Duchenne muscular dystrophy, and began using a wheelchair by the age of 12 after falling and breaking her leg. Her condition led to Akram being bullied by other children, which was ignored by the teachers in her school. Akram was then removed from her school, as they did not want to take responsibility for a physically disabled child. Her parents threatened to sue the school but withdrew as it would have affected the education of her siblings who were studying there. Applications to other schools followed, but these were rejected on the basis of her condition or nationality. Special schools were contacted, but she was rejected from those as she did not have a mental disability. Akram eventually tried homeschooling, but this was ineffective as it used part-time tutors.

Because of the lack of access to education, she began to feel depressed. Akram started to work at Mada, a non-profit disability organisation in Qatar. While there, she learnt about how social media can be used to promote ideas.

She has since helped children with disabilities in Qatar and middle east get an education and performed stand-up comedy as a comedian with Stand Up Comedy Qatar (SUCQ), the country's first and only collective of stand-up comedians, that was started in November 2010. Akram also works a model.

Akram took up the Paralympic sport Boccia, and expanded her social media presence including her Instagram nawaalakram & YouTube channel "Nawaal akram". In 2016, she founded the organisation Muscular Dystrophy Qatar to raise awareness of the condition within the country. She was named one of BBC's 100 Women programme, signifying her as one of the most influential and inspiration women of the year.
