= Akram Al-Ashqar =

Palestinian film director, photographer, IT professional

- Born: January 1, 1982 (age 44); Tulkarm, Palestine
- Occupation: International film director

Akram Al-Ashqar (Arabic: أكرم الأشقر) (born 1982) is a Palestinian film director global, photographer and IT professional. He was born in the city of Tulkarm in the West Bank.

== He started with the movies ==
Akram graduated from Arab American University in 2006 specializing in Computer Information Technology.

His films include: First Picture (2006), Red, Dead, Mediterranean (2006), and Paper War (2007). His short film, "Red, Dead and Mediterranean", portrays whole generations of Palestinian children who are obsessed with a sea they know nothing about. His short film, “Paper War”, summarizes the Lebanon war through the symbols present on the paper currency used.

His first professional documentary film, First Picture (2006), is the story of a Palestinian child from the Tulkarm Camp for Palestinian refugees. This child was born in one of the Israeli prisons. After spending more than two and a half years in prison, he was released independently from his mother, who remains imprisoned by the Israeli Authority. The film follows the child's adventures outside of prison under the protection of his family and with the companionship of his mother's freed friends from prison, and how his experience in prison shapes those adventures. The First Picture (2006) produced by the Arab Institute of Film. Al Ashqar's film Red, Dead and Mediterranean was featured as part of IN FOCUS, a London art exhibition focusing on artist's experiences in the Middle East.

== His international awards ==
- Libya Award in 2004.
- Mexico Award in 2017.
- Algeria Award in 2017.
- Sultanate of Oman International Festival Award in 2018.

== His films ==
- Red, Dead & Med, 2006.
- Palestine, Summer, 2006.
- Paper War, 2007.
- First Picture, 2007.
- Five Boys and A Wheel, 2016.
