= Ali Ekrem Bolayır =

Turkish politician

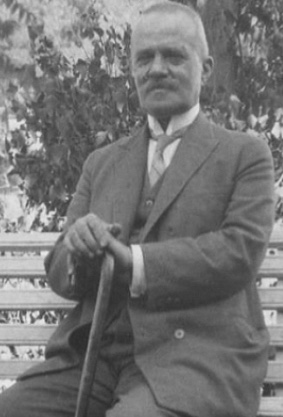

Personal details
- Born: 1867 Constantinople, Ottoman Empire
- Died: 1937 (aged 69–70)
- Party: CHP

Ali Ekrem Bolayır (1867–1937) was a Turkish politician and former governor of Jerusalem during the Ottoman period. He was an early key member of both the Turkish National Movement and the CHP. He was the son of Namık Kemal, and the father of Selma Ekrem.
