= Akram Assem =

Afghan historian

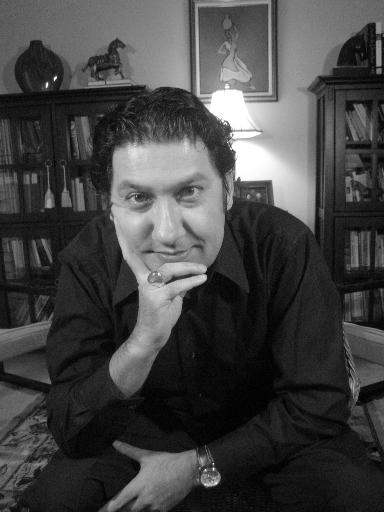
Assem Akram

Assem Akram (born 1965) is an Afghan historian, and author from Kabul, Afghanistan.

Akram holds a PhD in history from the University of Paris.

== Works ==
- The 1492' Conspiracy, A Machiavellian Plot to Seize the Holy Land and Keep the White House, Three-Horned Lion, June 2006, USA, 304 pages, English.
- A Study On Mohammad Daoud Khan (Negahe ba Shakhsiat, Nazariat wa Siassat ha-ye Sardar Mohammad Daoud), Mizan Publishing, August 2001, Alexandria-VA, 440 pages in Persian.
- History of the War of Afghanistan (Histoire de la guerre d’Afghanistan), Balland Publishing House, December 1996, Paris, 641 pages, in French. Re-printed in June 1998 & in December 2001 with updates.
- Fatal Ochre (Ocre fatale), Balland Publishing House, February 2001, Paris; fiction, 230 pages, in French.
