= Ekram Hossain =

Prof. Ekram Hossain
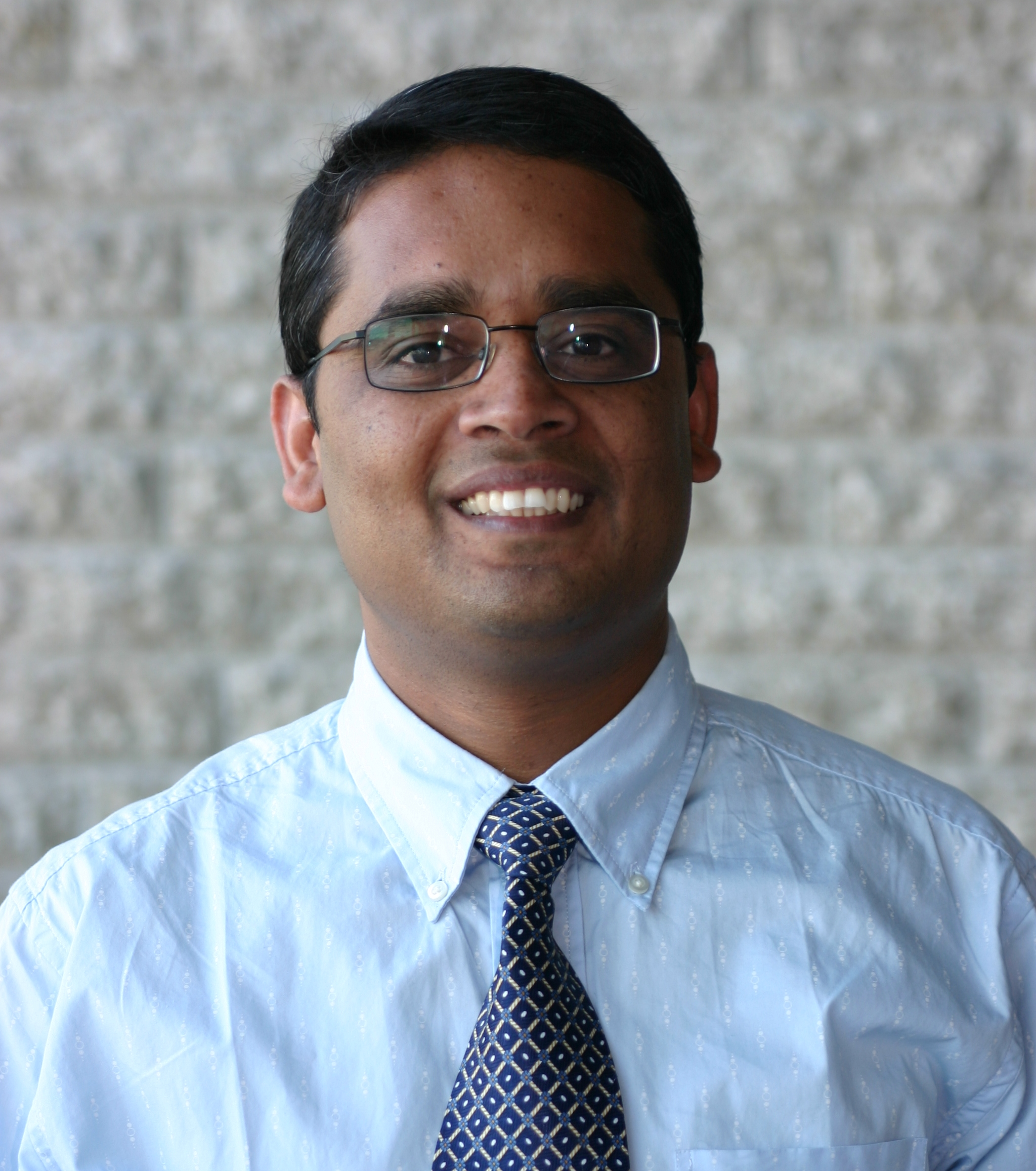
- Research area: Wireless communication networks
- Institution: University of Manitoba
- Personal webpage: http://home.cc.umanitoba.ca/~hossaina/

Ekram Hossain is a professor in the Department of Electrical and Computer Engineering at University of Manitoba, Winnipeg, Manitoba, Canada. Hossain leads the Wireless Communications, Networks, and Services Research Group at University of Manitoba and is former editor-in-chief for the IEEE Communications Surveys and Tutorials. In addition, Hossain has held visiting professorships at the School of Computer Engineering, Nanyang Technological University, Singapore (February 2011, August 2009), Tohoku University, Japan (November 2010), and School of Computer Science and Engineering, The University of New South Wales, Australia (June 2008).

Hossain's research in wireless communication networks is widely cited. In 2012, he received the Best Paper Award at the IEEE Wireless Communications and Networking Conference (WCNC) and the IEEE Communications Society Fred W. Ellersick Prize.

== Education ==
Hossain completed his Bachelor of Science (B.Sc.) and Master of Science (M.Sc.) at the Bangladesh University of Engineering and Technology (BUET) in Dhaka, Bangladesh before going on to complete a Ph.D. at the University of Victoria in Victoria, Canada.
