= Akram Osman =

Afghan writer, intellectual and novelist (1937–2016)

Mohammad Akram Osman
- محمد اکرم عثمان
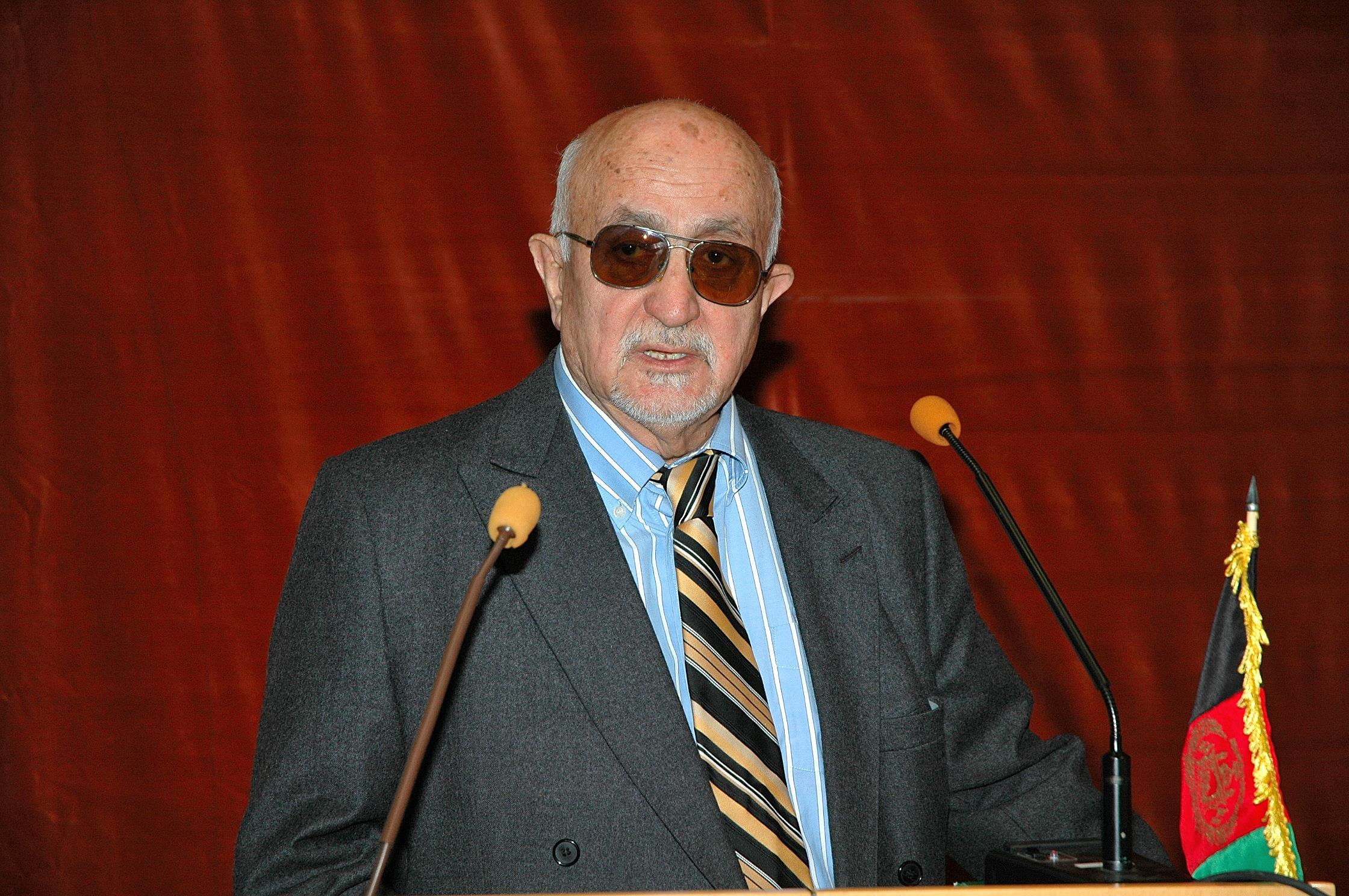
- Born: May 2, 1937; Herat, Afghanistan
- Died: August 11, 2016 (aged 79); Jönköping, Sweden
- Education: PhD in political science
- Alma mater: Faculty of Law and Political Science, University of Tehran
- Occupations: Short story writer, novelist, diplomat, historian, literary scholar
- Writing career
- Language: Persian/Dari
- Notable works: کوچۀ ما Our Street, مرداره قول اس Real Men Keep Their Word, وقتی که نیها گل میکنند When the Reeds Bloom, مرد و نامرد The Hero and the Coward

Mohammad Akram Osman (May 2, 1937 – August 11, 2016) was a renowned Afghan short-story writer, novelist, and intellectual. He was born in Herat, Afghanistan. He has his PhD from the Faculty of Law and Political Science at Tehran University. He has worked for years as a narrator and writer of several social–cultural programs in Afghanistan's Radio and Television. He has been head of the Art and Literature Department at Radio Afghanistan for some period. The majority of characters' names in his novels have Hazara names.

His last appointments were in the Ministry of Foreign Affairs of Afghanistan. Osman has worked from January 1990 to April 1991 as Afghan Consul General in the first Afghan consulate in the city of Dushanbe capital of Tajikistan, and from August 1991 to May 1992 he worked as Afghan Chargé d’affaires in Afghan Embassy in Tehran. Osman has been a member of Swedish Writers’ Union.

The Afghan film has produced two films based on two short stories by Osman. The films are based on the short stories Real Men Keep Their Word and The Deceptive Object.

Osman and his family emigrated to Sweden on August 28, 1992. He died in the city of Jönköping, Sweden August 11, 2016. He is buried in the Eastern cemetery in the city of Jönköping. Akram Osman was married to Maliha Osman, they have three children, one daughter Arzo Osman and two sons Maiwand Osman & Omid Osman.

The ninth annual Jalal Al-e Ahmad Literary Awards, Iran's most lucrative literary prize, paid tribute to Osman, the celebrated Afghan writer.

== Publications in Persian language ==
- وقتی که نیها گل میکنند When the Reeds Bloom (Collection of Short Stories), published by Afghanistan Writer Association at 1985.
- درز دیوار A Crack in the Wall (Collection of Short Stories), published by Baihaqi Book Press, Kabul at 1987.
- مرداره قول اس Real Men Keep Their Word (Collection of Short Stories), published by Afghanistan Writer Association at 1988.
- مرداره قول اس Real Men Keep Their Word (Collection of Short Stories), published by Maiwand Publications, Peshawar 1989.
- قحط سالی Famine (Collection of Short Stories), published by Afghans’ Pen Club in Stockholm, Baran 2003, Stockholm, 91-631-4540-5
- باز آفریده Recreated (Collection of Short Stories), published by Cultural Cooperation Association Qara Kamar in Sweden, Peshawar 2005
- کوچۀ ما Our Street (Novel), published by Kaweh verlag, Germany 2005, 91-631-7847-8
- مرداره قول اس Real Men Keep Their Word (Collection of Short Stories), New edition, published by CADA/Op Mercy Afghanistan, Kabul 2006
- مرداره قول اس Real Men Keep Their Word (Collection of Short Stories), New edition, published by CADA/Op Mercy Afghanistan, Kabul 2010
- کوچۀ ما Our Street (Novel), published by Mohammad Ibrahim Shariati Afghanistani (Erfan), 1st Edition, Tehran, Iran, 2009, 978-964-04-4314-9, 978-964-04-4316-3.
- کوچۀ ما Our Street (Novel), published by Mohammad Ibrahim Shariati Afghanistani (Erfan), 2nd Edition, Tehran, Iran, 2013, 978-600-65-8012-8.
- بازوی بریده Cut off Arm (Novel), published by Kaweh verlag, Germany, 2016
- مرداره قول اس، مجموعۀ کامل داستان های کوتاه اکرم عثمان Real Men Keep Their Word, published by Nashre Zaryab, Kabul, Afghanistan, 2017
- آن بالا و این پایین، گزیده داستان های اکرم عثمان, published by Taak Publication, Kabul, Afghanistan, 2019
- تاریخ افغانستان در صد سال اخیر, published by Café 60 Media, Stockholm, Sweden, 2022, 978-91-986704-2-4.

== Non-Persian publications ==
=== English ===
- Real Men Keep Their Word (A Selection of Short Stories), translated by Arley Loewen, published by Oxford University Press, Karachi 2005, 0-19-547114-8

=== German ===
- Moderne Erzähler Der Welt, Afghanistan, 1987, 3-7711-0787-3. Two short stories: Ein Man, ein Wort & Wenn die Binsen blühen.

=== Swedish ===
- Blodig gryning och andra noveller från Afghanistan, Stockholm, 1992, 91-86936-38-7. Two short stories: En man står vid sitt ord & När det blommar i säven.
- De Nya amerikabreven, 2005, 91-631-7963-6. One short story: Den fjärde katten.

=== Other languages ===
Some of Osman's writings have been published in Russian and Bulgarian languages and also in cyrillic alphabet in Tajikistan.

== Research papers ==
- Asian Production Method and classification of historical staging, published by Science Academy of Afghanistan, Kabul, 1990.
- Diplomatic Relations between Afghanistan and USSR (doctoral thesis), published by Gestepner, Faculty of Law and Political Science, Tehran University, 1971–2.
- The Operation of Historical Transformation in East, published by weekly paper Sareer in the Netherlands at 1996.

== Films based on Osman's short stories ==
- (مرد هاره قول اس Real Men Keep Their Word)
- (نقطه نیرنگی The Deceptive Object)
