= Failed States (book) =

2006 book by Noam Chomsky

- Author: Noam Chomsky
- Publisher: Metropolitan Books; Haymarket Books
- Publication date: April 2006; January 2024
- Media type: Print (paperback)
- Pages: 320
- ISBN: 9798888901434
- Dewey Decimal: 327.73009/0511 22
- LC Class: E902 .C468 2006

Failed States: The Abuse of Power and the Assault on Democracy is a book by Noam Chomsky, first published in 2006, in which Chomsky argues that the United States is becoming a "failed state", and thus a danger to its own people and the world. It was republished by Haymarket Books in January 2024.

== Context ==
The first chapter, titled "Stark, Dreadful, Inescapable" to allude to the famous Russell–Einstein Manifesto, argues that the US foreign and military policies following the Cold War greatly aggravated the danger of nuclear war. Chomsky then recounts various facts about the Iraq War and argues the United States specifically sought regime change, rather than the stated destruction of Iraq's WMD program.

== See also ==
- Abuse of power
- Corruption in the United States
