= Ekrem Ekinci =

Turkish academic and university rector

Ekrem Ekinci is Professor of Chemistry. Between 2008 and 2010, he was the rector of Işık University in Istanbul, Turkey.
