= List of towns and villages in Egypt =

This is a list of towns and villages in Egypt. There are 4,496 village municipalities and 199 town municipalities. Beyond the major cities, Egypt has numerous other towns and villages, many of which are centers for administration (markaz) or have historical significance.

== A ==
- Abd El Gilil
- Abnub
- Abu Durba
- Abu Ghusun
- Abu Haggag
- Abu Hammad
- Abu Hummus
- Abu Kabir
- Abu Mena
- Abu Minqar
- Abu Nusf
- Abu Qurqas
- Abu Rudeis
- Abu Sidhum
- Abu Tartur
- Abu Tesht
- Abu Tig
- Abu Uwaijilah
- Abu Zenima
- Abukir
- Ad-Daba
- Ad-Dabiya
- Ad-Dair
- Adabiya
- Aga
- Agami
- Ageeba
- Ain as-Sillin
- Ain Furtaga
- Ain Khudra
- Ain Ris
- Ain Sheikh Marzo
- Ain Sukhna
- Ain Umm Achmed
- Akhmim
- Al Matariya
- Al-Amiriya
- Al-Aqaba al-Kabira
- Al-Arish
- Al-Atamina
- Al-Ayyat
- Al-Badari
- Al-Ballas
- Al-Balyana
- Al-Birba
- Al-Burj
- Al-Burumbul
- Al-Fant
- Al-Fashn
- Al-Feiran
- Al-Gharaq
- Al-Hammam
- Al-Hamrawayn
- Al-Hamul
- Al-Harra
- Al-Hawamidiya
- Al-Hindaw
- Al-Husainiya
- Al-Jarawla
- Al-Kilh Gharb
- Al-Kuntilla
- Al-Kushh
- Al-Maadi
- Al-Madina al-Fakriya
- Al-Mahalla al Kubra
- Amrit
- An-Nasr
- Ar-Radisiya
- Armant
- As-Saff
- As-Salihiya
- As-Salum
- As-Sibiya
- As-Simbillawain
- Asfun al-Mataina
- Ash-Shaikh Fadl
- Ash-Shallufa
- Ash-Shatt
- Ashmun
- Assiut
- Asyut
- At-Tahiya
- At-Tina
- Atfih
- Awlad Elias
- Az-Zafarana
- Az-Zagaziq

== B ==
- Bahtit
- Balat
- Baltim
- Bani Ebeid
- Bani Mazar
- Bani Suwaif
- Banha
- Bardawil
- Bardis
- Baris
- Barramiya
- Benha
- Beni Suef
- Berenice
- Biba
- Bilbais
- Bilqas (Bilkas)
- Bimban
- Bir Abu Hashim
- Bir Asal
- Bir Ath-Thamad
- Bir el-Hamur
- Bir Quei
- Bir Safaga
- Bir Shalatain
- Bir Sivala
- Bir Umm Gherg
- Bir Wasif
- Birkat as-Sab
- Biyala
- Blondie
- Brnes
- Bulaq
- Buqbuq
- Bur Fuad
- Burj Mughaidhil

== C ==
- Cairo

== D ==
- Dahab
- Dair Mawas
- Dairut
- Dalja
- Damanhur
- Damas
- Daraw
- Dikarnis
- Dishna
- Disuq (Disuk)
- Dumiat (Damietta)
- Dschirdscha

== E ==
- Edfu
- El-Alamein
- El Barod Sharq
- El-Bawiti
- El-Ferdan
- El Ghawaben
- El-Gouna
- El-Kanayis
- El Khasos
- El-Kula
- El-Laqeita
- El Qoseir
- El Sahel Bahari
- El Shanaina
- El Thour
- El-Zawya
- Elat
- Esna
- Etiay Al-Baroud

== F ==
- Faqus
- Faraskur
- Faras
- Farshut
- Fayyum
- Fidimiin
- Fuka
- Fuwa

== G ==
- Gharb Mawhub
- Ghazal
- Ghazi
- Gilbana
- Girga
- Giza
- Gogar
- Guhaina

== H ==
- Hamata
- Hammam Faraun
- Hawr
- Hawsh Isa
- Heluan
- Higaza
- Hurghada

== I ==
- Ibshaway
- Idfa
- Idku
- Idmo
- Ismailiya
- Ismailia
- Isnit
- Itlidim
- Itsa
- Izbat Hasan Badr

== J ==
- Jabal an-Nur
- Jirza
- Juhayna

== K ==
- Kafr Abu Tirki
- Kafr ad-Dawwar
- Kafr ash-Seikh
- Kafr asch-Schaich
- Kafr El Hubi
- Kafr Salim
- Kafr Shubra Zangi
- Kafrat rahma
- Kafrat-Zayyat
- Kardous
- Kawm Hamada
- Khanika
- Kiman al-Mataina
- Kirdasa
- Kom Ombo

== L ==
- Lagona
- Luxor

== M ==
- Maghagha
- Mahallat Marhum
- Maidun
- Majres
- Mallawi
- Mandiska
- Manfalut
- Manqabad
- Marsa Alam
- Marsa Matrouh
- Marsa Shagra
- Masaid
- Matay
- Minuf
- Minya al-Qamb
- Mit Ghamr
- Monera
- Mons Claudianus
- Mons Porphyrites
- Mut

== N ==
- Nadir
- Nafisha
- Nag Hammadi
- Nakhl
- Naqada
- Nuweiba

== O ==
- Obour

== P ==
- Port Said

== Q ==
- Qalamun
- Qalyub
- Qara
- Qaret Zumaq
- Qasr al-Farafira
- Qasr Farafra
- Qasr Kharga
- Qena
- Qina
- Qift
- Qiman Al-Arus
- Qullin
- Qus

== R ==
- 10th of Ramadan
- Ramana
- Ras al-Hikma
- Ras el-Barr
- Ras el-Sudr
- Ras Gharrib
- Ras Jamsah
- Rashid

== S ==
- Sabdafa
- Safaga
- Saft El Laban
- Salwa al-Bahriya
- Samalut
- Samanud
- San al-Hajar al Qibliya
- Sannur
- Sauhadsh
- Sarabiyum
- Satamuni
- Sawl
- Sendion
- Sharm el-Sheikh
- Sheikh Shazly
- shubra bas
- Sherbin
- Shibin al-Kawm
- Shibin al-Qanatir
- Shirbin
- Shubra El-Kheima
- Sidi Abd ar-Rahman
- Sidi Barrani
- Sidi Hunaish
- Sidi Salim
- Sinnuris
- Siwa
- Sohag
- Sumusta al-Waqf
- Saqqara
- Suqayl

== T ==
- Taba
- Tabluha
- Tahta
- Tala
- Talcha
- Tala, EgyptTalla
- Tamiya
- Tanta
- Tighrinna
- Tihna al-Jabal
- Tima
- Tukh
- Tummwah
- Tunaida

== W ==
- Wadi Halfa
- Warraq Al Hadar
- Wadi Al Natroun

== Z ==
- Zaitun
- Zawiyar at-Tarfaya
- Zawiyat Shammas
- Zawiyatal-Awwama
- Zifta
- Zagazig

== See also ==
- List of cities in Egypt
