= Ibi (nomarch) =

Ancient Egyptian Nomarch

- Nomarch of the 8th nome of Upper Egypt
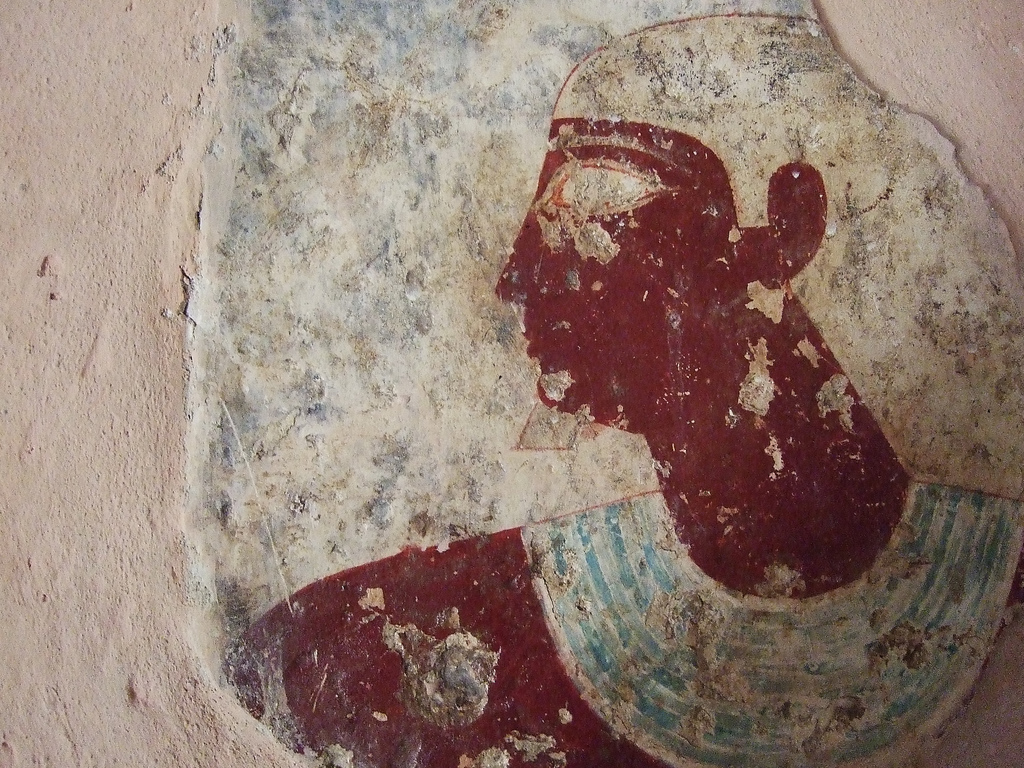
- A painted relief from Ibi's tomb
- Dynasty: 6th dynasty
- Burial: Asyut, Egypt
- Spouse: Hemre
- Children: Djau/Shemai; Khui; Ibi; Tekhyt

Ibi (fl. c. 2200 BC) was an Ancient Egyptian Nomarch around the end of the 6th Dynasty. He is well known from his rock cut tomb at Deir el-Gabrawi.

Ibi bears in his tomb a high number of titles. He was Iry-pat (member of the elite), Haty-a and royal sealer. These were high titles at the royal court. He was also priest at the pyramid temple of king Pepi II, but most importantly also Nomarch (overlord) of Ta-wer, the eighth Upper Egyptian province, and overlord of Dju-fet, the Twelfth Upper Egyptian province.

His rock cut tomb consists of a decorated chapel and several shafts leading to underground burial chambers. The scenes in his tomb show Ibi several times in front of workmen and in front of an offering table. In his tomb chapel are also depicted his wife Hemre, and his sons, such as Djau/Shemai, Khui and Ibi. His daughter Tekhyt appears in the decoration of the tomb too, but is also known from her own decorated tomb.

== Literature ==
- Norman de Garis Davies, W. E. Crum, George Albert Boulenger: The rock tombs of Deir el Gebrâwi, Part I.-Tomb of Aba and smaller Tombs of the Southeen Group. London 1902 online
- Naguib Kanawati: Deir El-Gebrawi. 2 The Southern Cliff: the Tomb of Ibi and Others (= The Australian Centre for Egyptology, Reports. Band 25). Aris & Phillips, Oxford 2007, ISBN 978-0-85668-808-9.
