= Henqu I =

Ancient Egyptian Nomarch

Henqu
- Nomarch of the 12th nome of Upper Egypt
- Dynasty: 6th Dynasty
- Burial: Asyut, Egypt
- Spouse: Bendjet
- Children: Impy; Henqu; Hemre; Khetetu; Shefau

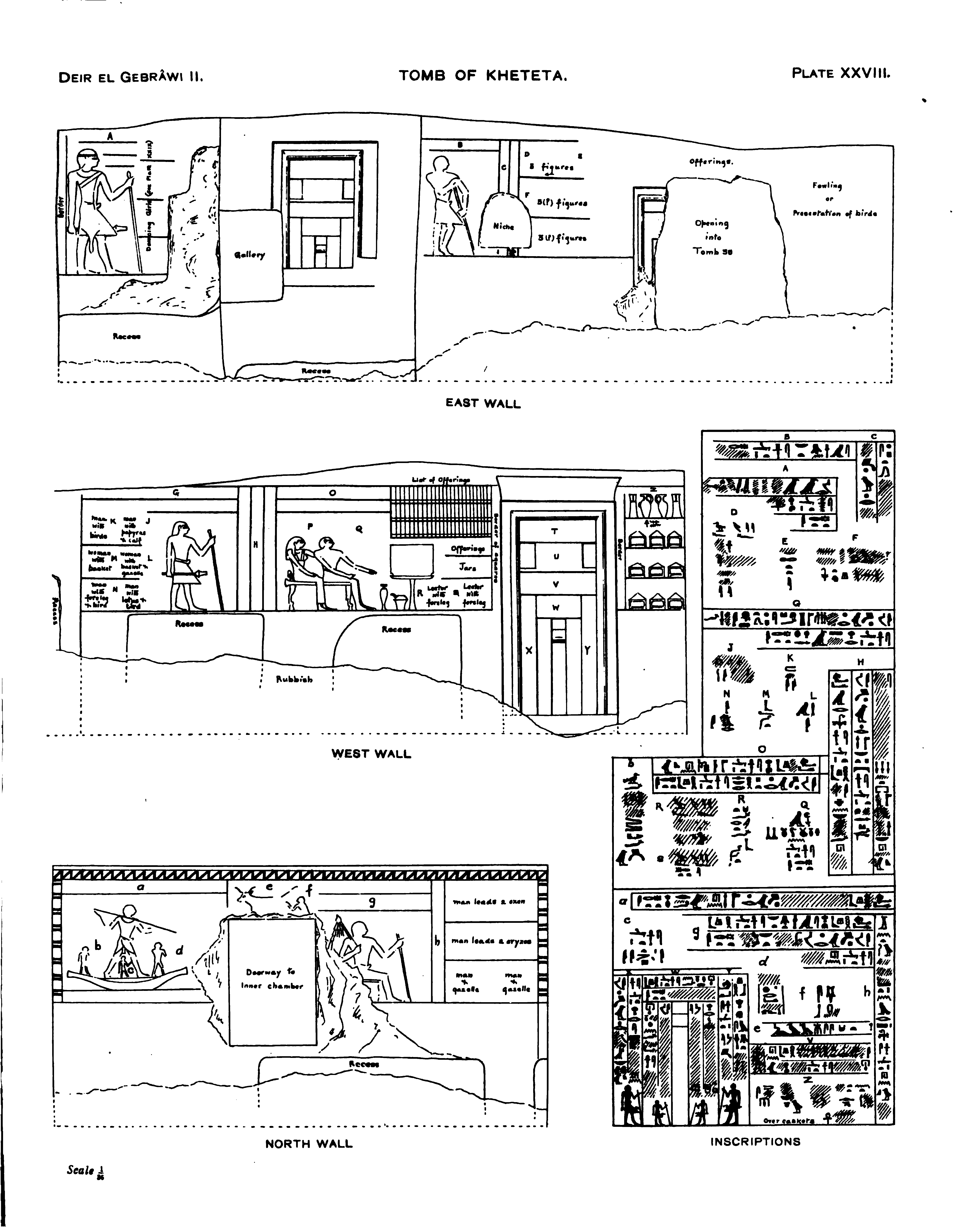
the tomb decoration as published by Norman de Garis Davies

Henqu I, with the second (good name) name Kheteti (fl. c. 2200 BC), was an Ancient Egyptian Nomarch around the end of the 6th Dynasty. He is well known from his rock cut tomb at Deir el-Gabrawi.

In his decorated tomb chapel (modern number N39) he bears several important titles showing that he was overlord (Nomarch) of Dju-fet, the 12th Upper Egyptian province. The title Overseer of Upper Egypt shows that he had responsibilities beyond his own Nome. His highest ranking title was sole friend. In his tomb chapel are also depicted his wife Bendjet and his sons Impy, Henqu, Hemre, Khetetu, and Shefau.

His tomb chapel is cut into the rocks and decorated with paintings. Much of them are lost today. There are several shafts going down to burial chambers. On the north wall of the chapel, Henqu is shown hunting in the marshes and sitting while herdsmen bring cattle. On the east wall he is standing in front of dancers and in front of offering bearers. On the west wall he is depicted with his wife sitting in front of an offering table.

== Literature ==
- Norman de Garis Davies (1902): The Rock Tombs of Deir el Gebrâwi. II: Tombs of Zau and Tombs of the Northern Group (= Archaeological Survey of Egypt. Twelfth Memoir). London. (online).
- Naguib Kanawati (2005): Deir el-Gebrawi. Vol. I: The Northern Cliff (= The Australian Centre for Egyptology, Reports. volume 23). Oxford.
