= List of ancient Egyptian sites =

This is a list of ancient Egyptian sites, throughout Egypt and Nubia. Sites are listed by their classical name whenever possible, if not by their modern name, and lastly with their ancient name if no other is available.

== Nomes ==
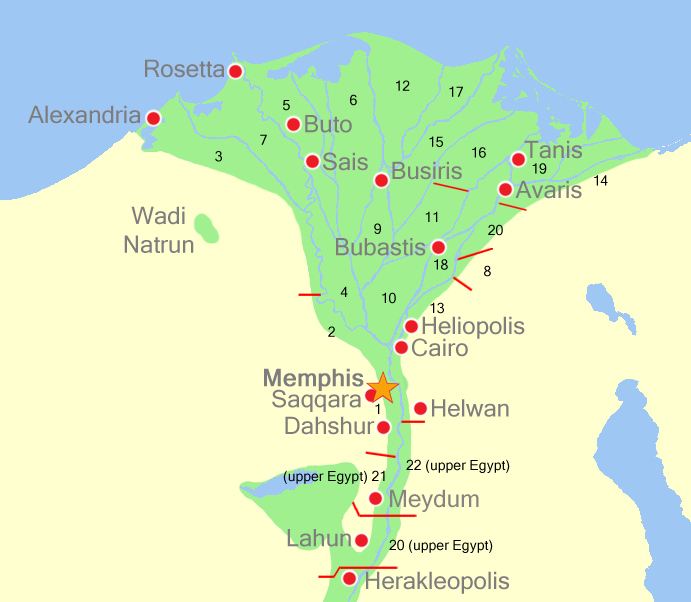
The nomes of Ancient Egypt, in lower Egypt

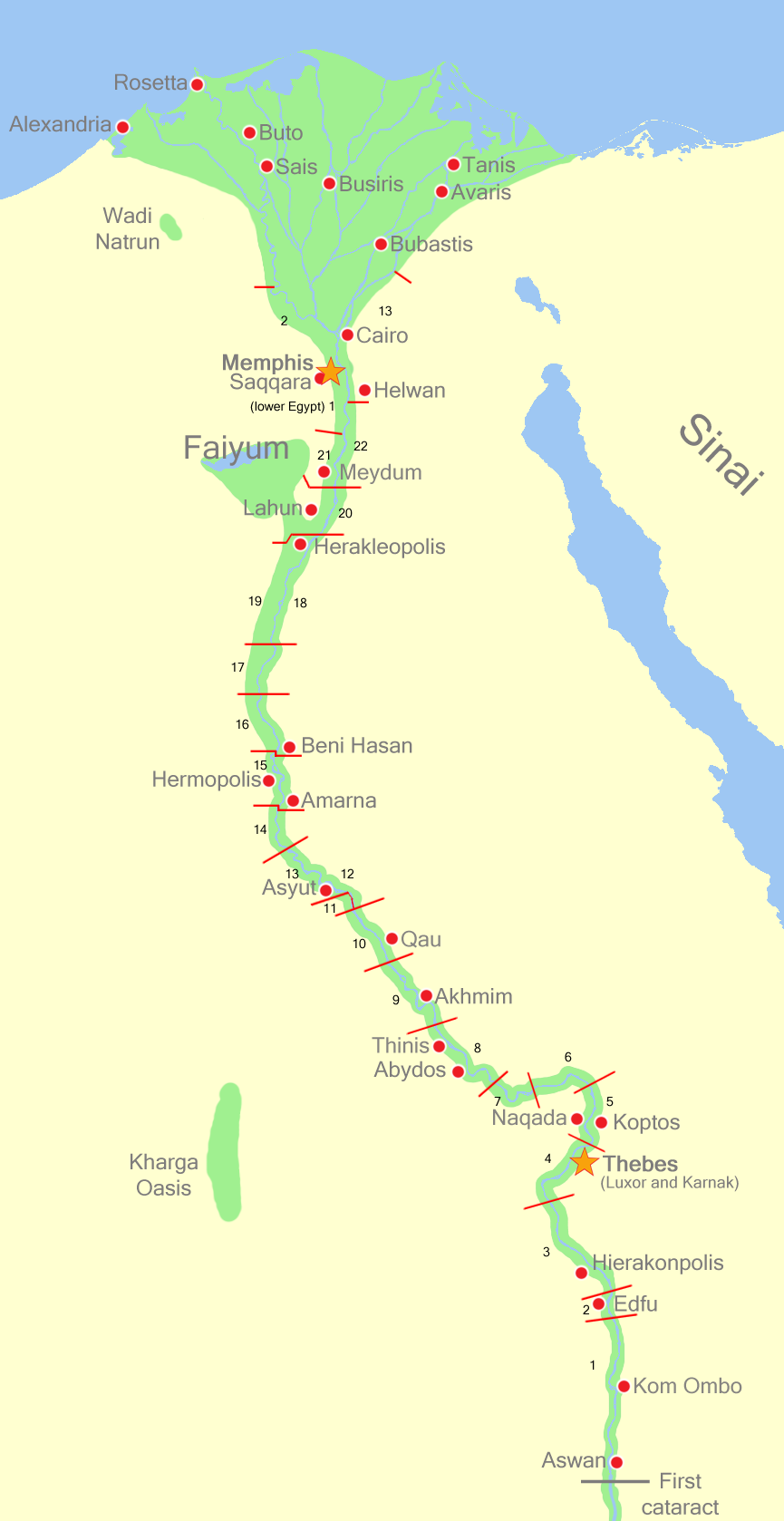
The nomes of Ancient Egypt, in upper Egypt

A nome is a subnational administrative division of Ancient Egypt.

=== Lower Egypt ===
- Nome 1: White Walls
- Nome 2: Cow's thigh
- Nome 3: West
- Nome 4: Southern Shield
- Nome 5: Northern Shield
- Nome 6: Mountain bull
- Nome 7: West harpoon
- Nome 8: East harpoon
- Nome 9: Andjety
- Nome 10: Black bull
- Nome 11: Heseb bull
- Nome 12: Calf and Cow
- Nome 13: Prospering Scepter
- Nome 14: Eastmost
- Nome 15: Fish
- Nome 16: Djehuti
- Nome 17: The Throne
- Nome 18: Prince of the South
- Nome 19: Prince of the North
- Nome 20: Plumed Falcon

=== Upper Egypt ===
- Nome 1: Land of the bow
- Nome 2: Throne of Horus
- Nome 3: The Shrine
- Nome 4: The sceptre
- Nome 5: The two falcons
- Nome 6: The crocodile / Dendera
- Nome 7: Sistrum
- Nome 8: Great lands
- Nome 9: Minu (Min)
- Nome 10: Cobra
- Nome 11: The Set animal (Seth)
- Nome 12: Viper mountain
- Nome 13: Upper pomegranate tree (Upper Sycamore and Viper)
- Nome 14: Lower pomegranate tree (Lower Sycamore and Viper)
- Nome 15: Hare
- Nome 16: Oryx
- Nome 17: The black dog (Jackal)
- Nome 18: Falcon with spread wings (Nemty)
- Nome 19: The pure sceptre (Two Sceptres)
- Nome 20: Upper laurel (Southern Sycamore)
- Nome 21: Lower laurel (Northern Sycamore)
- Nome 22: Knife
- Gabal El Haridi

== Lower Egypt (The Nile Delta) ==
- Alexandria
  - Great Library of Alexandria
  - Pharos of Alexandria
  - Pompey's Pillar
- Athribis (Modern: "Tell Atrib", Ancient: "Hut-Heryib" or "Hut-Tahery-Ibt")
- Avaris (Modern: "Tell el-Dab'a", Ancient: "Pi-Ri'amsese")
- Behbeit el-Hagar
- Bilbeis
- Bubastis (Modern: "Tell Basta", Ancient: "Bast")
- Busiris (Modern: "Abu Sir Bana")
- Buto (Modern: "Tell el-Fara'in", Ancient: "Pe")
- Cairo (or near Cairo)
  - Abu Rawash
  - Giza Necropolis (Giza Plateau)
    - Khufu's Pyramid (Great Pyramid)
    - Khafre's Pyramid
    - Menkaure's Pyramid
    - Great Sphinx of Giza
  - Heliopolis (Modern: "Tell Hisn", Ancient: "Iunu")
  - Letopolis (Modern: "Ausim", Ancient: "Khem")
- Hermopolis Parva (Modern: "El-Baqliya" Ancient: "Ba'h")
- Iseum (Modern: "Behbeit el-Hagar", Ancient: "Hebyt")
- Kom el-Hisn (Ancient: "Imu" or "Yamu")
- Kom-el-Gir
- Leontopolis (Yahudiya) (Modern: "Tell el-Yahudiya", Ancient: "Nay-Ta-Hut")
- Leontopolis (Modern: "Tell el-Muqdam")
- Naukratis (Modern: "el-Gi'eif", "el-Niqrash", "el-Nibeira")
- Memphite Necropolis (Memphis)
  - Abu Ghurab
  - Abusir (Busiris)
    - Pyramid of Neferefre
    - Pyramid of Neferirkare
    - Pyramid of Nyuserre
    - Pyramid of Sahure
    - Sun temple of Nyuserre
    - Sun temple of Userkaf
  - Dahshur
    - Bent Pyramid
    - Black Pyramid
    - Red Pyramid
    - White Pyramid
  - Helwan
  - Mazghuna
    - Northern Mazghuna pyramid
    - Southern Mazghuna pyramid
  - Mit Rahina
  - Saqqara
    - Sekhemkhet's Buried Pyramid
    - Gisr el-mudir
    - Haram el-Shawaf
    - Pyramid of Ibi
    - Pyramid of Khendjer
    - Pyramid of Teti
    - Pyramid of Unas
    - Pyramid of Userkaf
    - Step Pyramid of Djoser
    - Southern South Saqqara pyramid
  - Zawyet el'Aryan
    - Layer Pyramid
    - Unfinished Northern Pyramid of Zawyet El Aryan
- Mendes (Modern: "Tell el-Rub'a", Ancient: "'Anpet")
  - Tell Tebilla
- Qantir / El-Khata'na
- Sais (Modern: "Sa el-Hagar", Ancient: "Zau")
- Saft el-Hinna (Ancient: "Per-Sopdu")
- Sebennytos (Modern: "Samannud", Ancient: "Tjebnutjer")
- Shagamba
- Suwa
- Taposiris Magna (Modern: "Abusir")
- Tanis (Modern: "San el-Hagar", Ancient: "Djan'net")
- Tell el-Maskhuta (Ancient: "Tjeku")
- Tell el-Rataba
- Tell el-Sahaba
- Tell Nebesha
- Tell Qua'
- Terenuthis (Modern: "Kom Abu Billo")
- Thmuis (Modern: "Tell el-Timai")
- Tura
- Xois (Modern: "Sakha")

== Middle Egypt ==
The area from about Faiyum to Asyut is usually referred to as Middle Egypt.

- Akoris (Modern: "Tihna el-Gebel")
  - Fraser Tombs
- Amarna (Ancient: "Akhetaten")
- Ankyronpolis (Modern: "el-Hiba", Ancient: "Teudjoi")
- Antinoöpolis (Modern: "el-Sheikh 'Ibada")
- Dara
  - Pyramid of Khui
- Deir el-Bersha
- Deir el-Gabrawi
- Dishasha
- Dja (Modern: "Medinet Madi" Ancient: "Narmouthis")
- El-Sheikh Sa'id
- Faiyum
  - Crocodilopolis (Roman period: "Arsinoe", Ancient: "Shedet")
  - el-Lahun
  - Hawara
  - Herakleopolis Magna (Modern: "Ihnasiyyah al-Madinah", Ancient: "Henen-Nesut")
  - Kom Medinet Gurob
  - Lisht
  - Meidum
  - Sidment el-Gebel
  - Soknopaiou Nesos
  - Tarkhan
- Hermopolis Magna (Modern: "El Ashmunein", Ancient: "Khmun")
- Hebenu (Modern: "Kom el-Ahmar")
  - Beni Hasan
  - Speos Artemidos (Modern: "Istabl 'Antar")
  - Zawyet el-Maiyitin
    - Pyramid of Zawyet el-Maiyitin
- Herwer
- Lykopolis (Modern: "Asyut", Ancient: "Zawty")
- Meir
- Oxyrhynchus (Modern: "el-Bahnasa", Ancient: "Per-Medjed")
- Sharuna
- Tuna el-Gebel

== Upper Egypt ==
=== Northern Upper Egypt ===
- Abydos (Ancient: "Abedju")
  - el-'Araba el Madfuna
  - Kom el-Sultan
  - Umm el-Qa'ab
  - Shunet ez Zebib
  - Osireion
- Apollinopolis Parva (Modern: "Qus", Ancient: "Gesa" or "Gesy")
- Antaeopolis (Modern: "Qaw el-Kebir", Ancient: "Tjebu" or "Djew-Qa")
- Ar Raqāqinah (Known as "Reqaqnah")
- Athribis (Modern: "Wannina", Ancient: "Hut-Repyt")
- Beit Khallaf
- Diospolis Parva (Modern: "Hiw", Ancient: "Hut-Sekhem")
- el-Hawawish
- el-Salamuni
- Khemmis or Panopolis (Modern: "Akhmin", Ancient: "Ipu" or "Khent-Min")
  - El Hawawish
  - El Salamuni
- Gebel el-Haridi
- Idfa
- Khenoboskion (Modern: "el-Qasr", "el-Saiyad")
- Koptos (Modern: "Qift", Ancient: "Gebtu")
- Naga ed-Der
- Nag' el-Madamud (Ancient: "Mabu")
- Ombos (Naqada) (Modern: "Naqada", Ancient: "Nubt")
- Shanhûr

=== Southern Upper Egypt ===
- Aphroditopolis (Modern: "Gebelein", Ancient: "Per-Hathor")
- Apollinopolis Magna (Modern: "Edfu", Ancient: "Djeba, Mesen")
- Aswan
- el-Mo'alla (Ancient: "Hefat")
- Eileithyiaspolis (Modern: "el-Kab", Ancient: "Nekheb")
- Gebel el-Silsila (Ancient: "Kheny")
- Hermonthis (Modern: "Armant", Ancient: "Iuny")
- Hierakonpolis (Modern: "Kom el-Ahmar", Ancient: "Nekhen")
  - Kom al-Ahmar Necropolis
- Iu-miteru
- Kom Ombo
- Latopolis (Modern: "Esna", Ancient: "Iunyt, Senet, Tasenet")
- Luxor (Ancient: "Ipet-Resyt")
  - Deir el-Bahari
  - Qasr el-'Aguz
  - Qurna
    - el-Assasif
    - el-Khokha
    - el-Tarif
    - Dra' Abu el-Naga'
    - Qurnet Murai
    - Sheikh Abd el-Qurna
  - Valley of the Kings
  - Valley of the Queens
- Sumenu
- Tuphium (Modern: "Tod", Ancient: "Djerty")

== Nubia ==
=== Lower Nubia ===
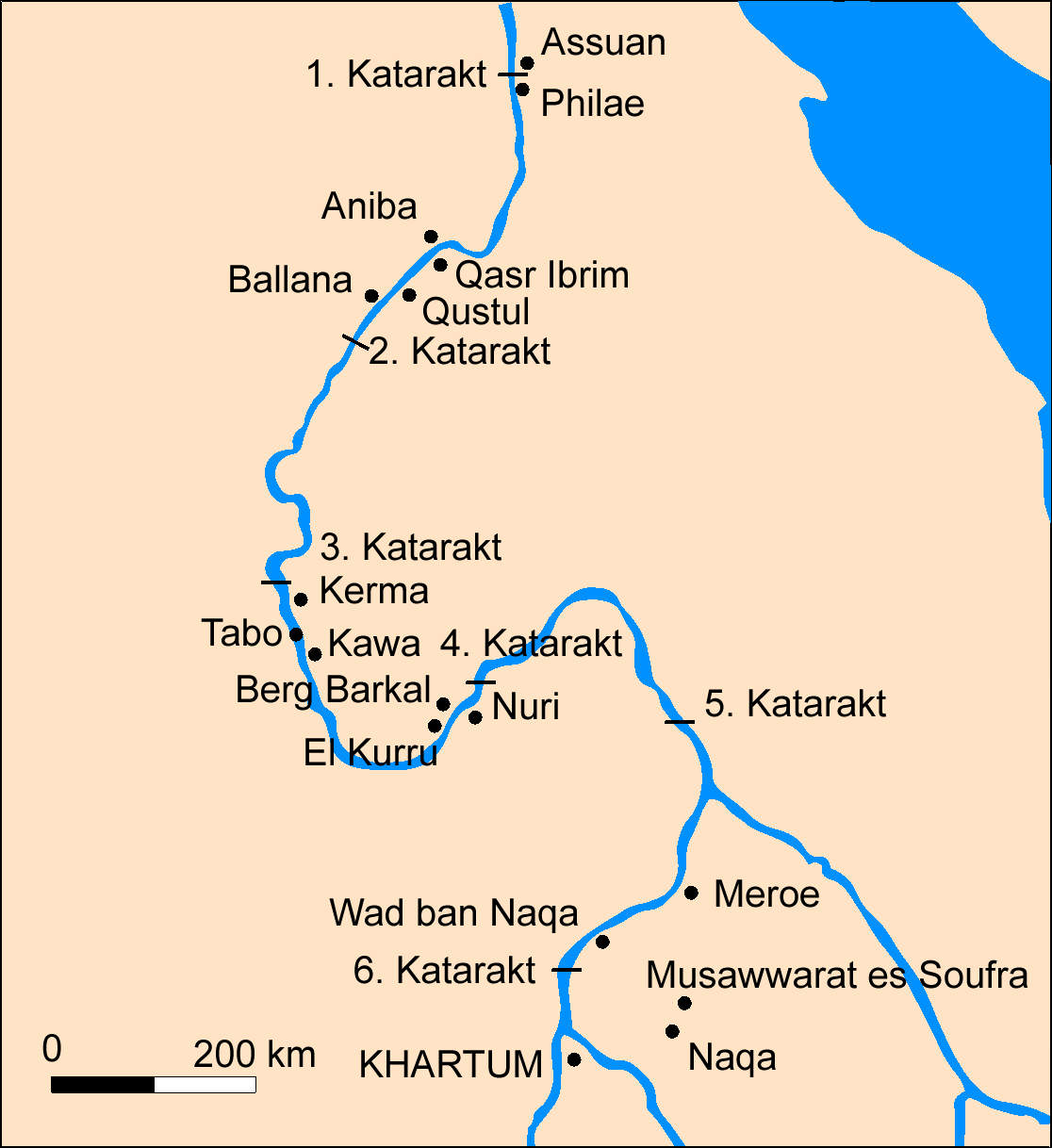
Map of Nubia

- Philae temple complex
- New Amada
- Abu Simbel
- Contra Pselchis (Modern: "Quban", Ancient: "Baki")
- Debod
- el-Lessiya
- Temple of Ellesyia
- Mi'am (Modern: "'Aniba")
- Qasr Ibrim / Primis (Modern: "Qasr Ibrim")
- Pselchis (Modern: "el-Dakka", Ancient: "Pselqet")
  - Temple of Dakka
- New Kalabsha
  - Beit el-Wali
  - Temple of Derr
  - Gerf Hussein
- New Wadi es-Sebua
- Taphis (Modern: "Tafa")
- Tutzis (Modern: "Dendur")
- Tzitzis (Modern: "Qertassi")

=== Upper Nubia ===
- 'Amara East
- 'Amara West
- Abahuda (Abu Oda)
- Aksha (Serra West)
- Askut Island
- Buhen
- Dabenarti
- Dibeira
- Dorginarti Island
- Faras
- Gebel el-Shams
- Gebel Barkal
- Kor
- Kumma
- Meinarti Island
- Qustul
- Semna
- Semna South
- Serra East
- Shalfak
- Uronarti Island
- Jebel Dosha
- Soleb
- Saï
- Saï, Temple of Ahmose-Nefertari
- Sesebi
- Tabo (Nubia)
- Delgo, Sudan
- Sedeinga, Temple of Queen Tiye
- Tombos (Nubia)
- Kawa, Sudan
- Napata
- Kanisah Kurgus
- Sanam, Sudan

== Oases and Mediterranean coast ==
- Siwa Oasis
  - Aghurmi
  - el-Zeitun
  - Gebel el-Mawta
  - Qaret el-Musabberin
  - Umm el-'Ebeida
- Bahariya Oasis
  - el-Qasr
  - el-Bawiti
  - el-Hayz
- Farafra Oasis
  - 'Ain el-Wadi
  - el-Qasr
- el-Dakhla Oasis
  - Amheida
  - Balat
  - Deir el-Hager
  - el-Qasr
  - Kellis (Modern: "Ismant el-Kharab")
  - Mut el-Kharab
  - Qaret el-Muzawwaqa
- el-Kharga Oasis
  - Baris
  - Gebel el-Teir
  - Hibis
  - Kysis (Modern: "Dush")
  - Nadurs
  - Qasr el-Ghueida
  - Qasr Zaiyan
- Mediterranean Coast
  - Zawiyet Umm el-Rakham
  - Tell es-Sakan

== Sinai ==
- Aqaba
- Arsinoe
- Eilat (Elath)
- Kuntillet Ajrud
- Ostrakine
- Pelusium (Sin)
- Rud el-'Air
- Serabit el-Khadim
- Tell Kedwa
- Wadi Maghareh

== Eastern Desert ==
- Wadi Hammamat

== Bibliography ==
- Atlas of Ancient Egypt, John Baines & Jaromir Malek, America University of Cairo Press, 2002
