= Hemre Isi =

Ancient Egyptian Nomarch

Hemre
- Vizier of Egypt; Nomarch of the 12th nome of Upper Egypt
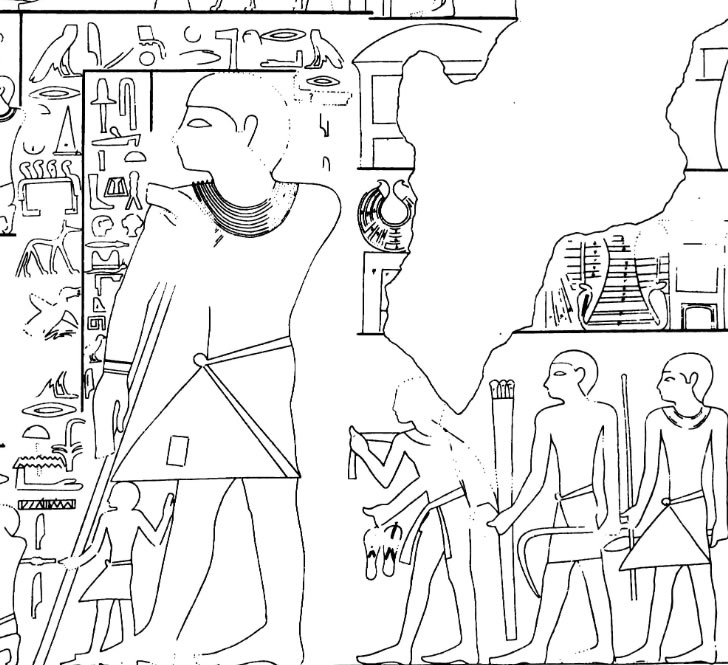
- Hemre, shown in his tomb chapel
- Tenure: c. 2200 BC
- Dynasty: 6th dynasty
- Burial: Asyut, Egypt
- Spouse: Hemre
- Children: Isi; Nisuked

Hemre, with the second (good name) name Isi (fl. c. 2200 BC), was an Ancient Egyptian Nomarch around the end of the 6th Dynasty. He is well known from his rock-cut tomb at Deir el-Gabrawi.

In his decorated tomb chapel, Hemre bears many titles: most importantly he was overlord of Dju-fet, (Nomarch or governor) the 12th Upper Egyptian nome, but also had the title of a vizier, which granted him a very high status, second only to the king. His wife was also called Hemre. two sons are known by nameː Isi and Nisuked.

The tomb chapel of Hemre (modern number N72) consists of two rooms. The first, larger one is decorated with paintings. Several shafts are leading down to burial chambers. The paintings are not well preserved and were badly damaged by art robbers in the 1970s. On the north wall, Hemre is shown on front of craftsmen. Smiths and jewellery makers are depicted, as well as a harvest scene. On the east wall, Hemre is sitting in front of dancers.

== Literature ==
- Norman de Garis Davies (1902): The Rock Tombs of Deir el Gebrâwi. II: Tombs of Zau and Tombs of the Northern Group (= Archaeological Survey of Egypt. Twelfth Memoir). London. (online).
- Naguib Kanawati (2005): Deir el-Gebrawi. Vol. I: The Northern Cliff (= The Australian Centre for Egyptology, Reports. volume 23). Oxford, pp. 37-59, plates 13-21, 41-50
