= Majres =

Village in Asyut Governorate, Egypt

Majres مجريس
- Village
- Location in Egypt
- Coordinates: 26°58′38″N 31°22′43″E
- Country: Egypt
- Governorate: Asyut
- District: Sodfa
- Time zone: UTC+2 (EST)

Majres is one of the villages surrounding the towns of Sodfa in the Asyut Governorate, Egypt. According to statistics from the year 2006, the total population in Majres was 11858 people, of which 6093 are men and 5765 women.
