= Awlad Elias =

Village in Asyut Governorate, Egypt

- Village
- Location of Awlad Elias in Egypt
- Coordinates: 26°56′16″N 31°24′23″E
- Country: Egypt
- Governorate: Asyut
- Time zone: UTC+2 (EST)

Awlad Elias village is one of the villages of sodfa in Asyut Governorate, Egypt. According to statistics from the year 2006, the total population in Awlad Elias was 16283 people, 8521 men and 7762 women.
