= El Fateh =

City in Egypt

El-Fateh is an Egyptian city located near the city of Abnub in the Asyut Governorate.
