= Kardous =

Village in Asyut Governorate, Egypt

- Village
- Location in Egypt
- Coordinates: 26°56′00″N 31°24′00″E
- Country: Egypt
- Governorate: Asyut
- District: Sodfa
- Time zone: UTC+2 (EST)

Kardous village is one of the villages of sodfa in Asyut Governorate, Egypt. According to statistics from the year 2006, the total population in Kardous was 8268 people, 4389 men and 3879 women.
