= El Shanaina =

Village in Asyut Governorate, Egypt

Ash Shanāyinah
- Location in Egypt
- Coordinates: 26°54′41″N 31°22′52″E
- Country: Egypt
- Governorate: Asyut Governorate
- Time zone: UTC+2 (EST)

El Shanaina village is one of the villages surrounding the town of Sodfa in the Asyut Governorate, Egypt. According to statistics from 2006, the total population in El Shanaina was 5726 people, 2908 men and 2818 women.
