= El Barod Sharq =

Village in Asyut Governorate, Egypt

- Location in Egypt
- Coordinates: 26°56′00″N 31°25′00″E
- Country: Egypt
- Governorate: Asyut Governorate
- Time zone: UTC+2 (EST)

El Barod Sharq is one of the villages surrounding the town of Sodfa in the Asyut Governorate, Egypt. According to statistics from the year 2006, the total population in El Barod Sharq was 3168 people, of which 1620 are men and 1548 women.
