= Sugarcane juice =

Liquid extracted from sugarcane

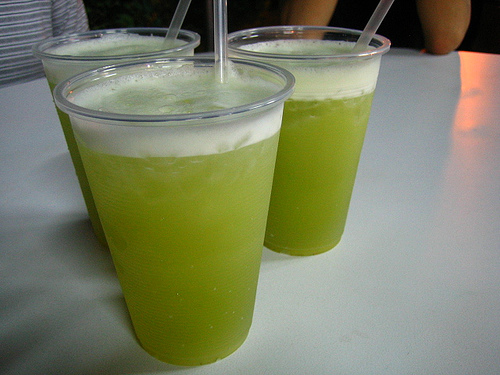
Sugarcane juice

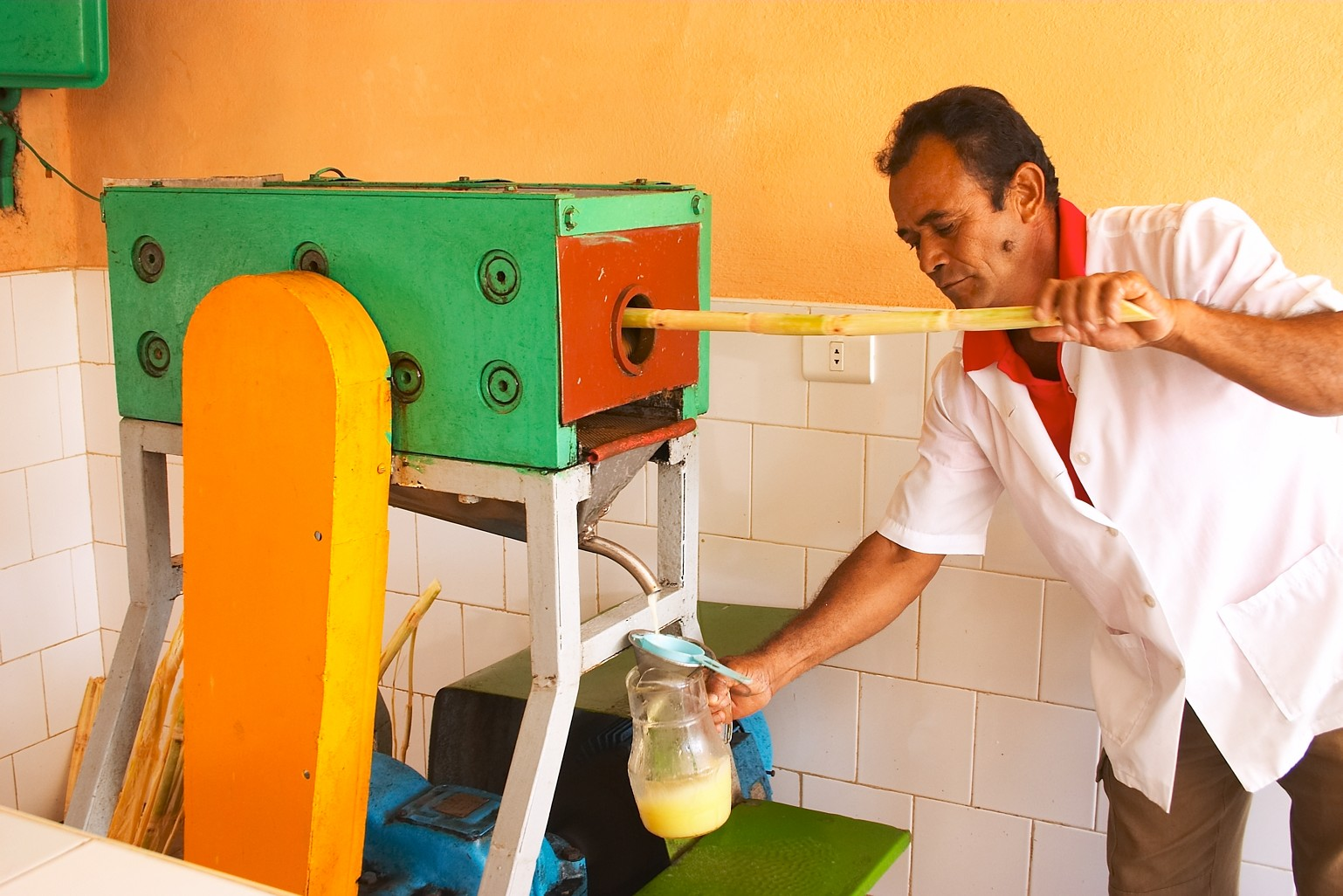
Machine used to crush sugar cane to obtain the juice

Sugarcane juice is the liquid extracted from pressed sugarcane. It is consumed as a beverage in many places, especially where sugarcane is commercially grown, such as Southeast Asia, the Indian subcontinent, the Caribbean, North Africa, mainly Egypt, and also in South America, especially Brazil. Sugarcane juice is obtained by crushing peeled sugarcane in a mill and is one of the main precursors of rum.

== Health risks ==
A mechanical method of extracting sugarcane juice

There are some diseases that can be transmitted by raw sugarcane, such as leptospirosis. In Brazil, sugarcane juice has been linked to cases of Chagas disease, as sugarcane can contain traces of its responsible pathogen, Trypanosoma cruzi, left by infected insects if not properly cleaned.

Drinking sugarcane juice in Egypt may pose health risks due to contamination with the mycotoxins aflatoxin B_{1} and fumonisin B_{1}.

== Countries ==
=== Brazil ===
Sugarcane juice, known locally as caldo de cana, or garapa, is commonly sold by street vendors in Brazil. In a process similar to that of the street vendors of India, machines are used to press the sugarcane and the juice is extracted. It is sometimes served with lime or pineapple juice.

=== Egypt ===
In Egypt, sugarcane juice is known as asab and is sold in juice shops around the country. The largest juice shop in Egypt is in Saft El Laban, Giza. Egyptians also mix lemon with asab and let it ferment to produce a fermented variant of the drink. The most highly prized asab comes from Minya, Egypt.

=== India ===
Sugarcane juice is sold by street vendors throughout India. The vendors put the sugarcane in a machine, which presses and extracts the sugarcane juice out. Sugarcane juice is usually served with a dash of lime and/or ginger juice. It is a very popular drink, especially during summer months, as a refreshing form of heat relief.

Before sugarcane was introduced to the southern region, it had already been cultivated for many centuries in Southeast Asia and India for its sweet juice, which was used to produce crude sugar. When Jesuit priests began growing sugarcane in what is now downtown New Orleans in 1751, they faced challenges in efficiently converting its juice into sugar due to the high costs, unreliability, and lack of profitability. However, by the 1790s, businessman Etienne de Bore, along with skilled sugar maker Antoine Morin from Santo Domingo, successfully refined sugarcane juice into granulated sugar, thereby achieving profitability in the process.

=== Indonesia ===
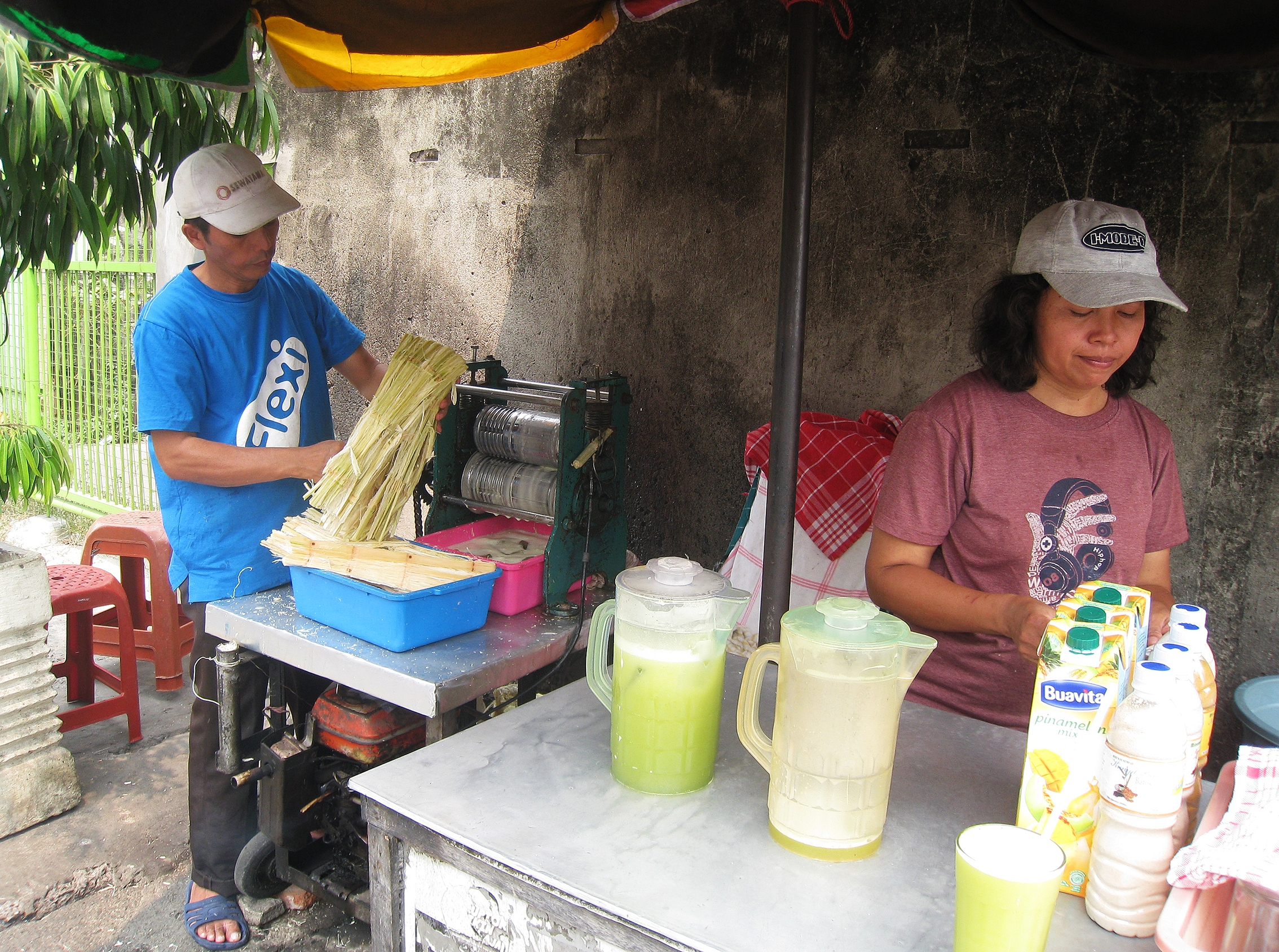
Es air tebu, iced sugarcane juice sold by street vendor in Jakarta, Indonesia.

In Indonesia, sugarcane juice drink is called minuman sari tebu. The iced sugar cane juice is called es tebu. In Indonesian, tebu is sugarcane and es is ice. It is one of the traditional beverages commonly sold street-side in Indonesia. The sugarcane plant has been cultivated in Java since ancient times. The earliest record comes from a 9th-century inscription, dated from the Medang Mataram period, that describes a sweet drink called Nalaka Rasa, which translates as "sugarcane juice".

The juice is extracted using a pressing machine to squeeze the sugary sap from sugarcane. The machine might be human-powered, or powered by a gasoline engine or electricity. The juice sold there is always served cold with ice cubes. Traditionally, it is sold throughout the country, especially among street vendors that set their stall on the street side. Today, cleaner vendors work in food courts of malls and shopping centers.

=== Kenya ===
Sugarcane juice is popular drink, commonly sold in juice shops around the country.

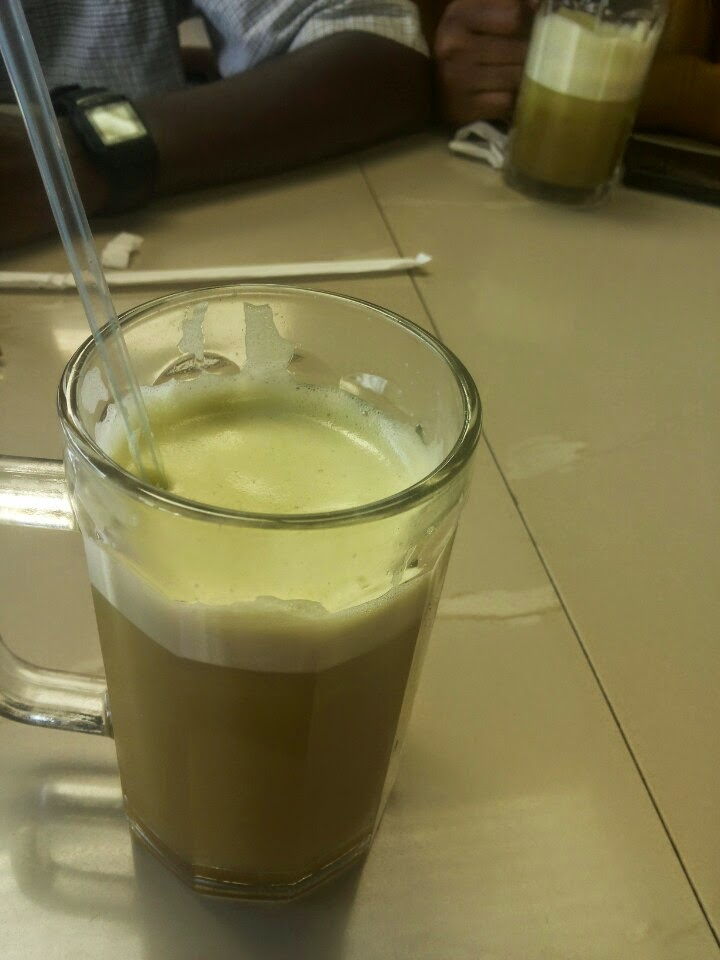
Sugarcane drink

=== Madagascar ===
In the eastern region of Madagascar, sugarcane juice is fermented to make an inexpensive alcoholic beverage called betsa-betsa. The drink is popular with locals because it is cheaper than beer.

=== Myanmar ===
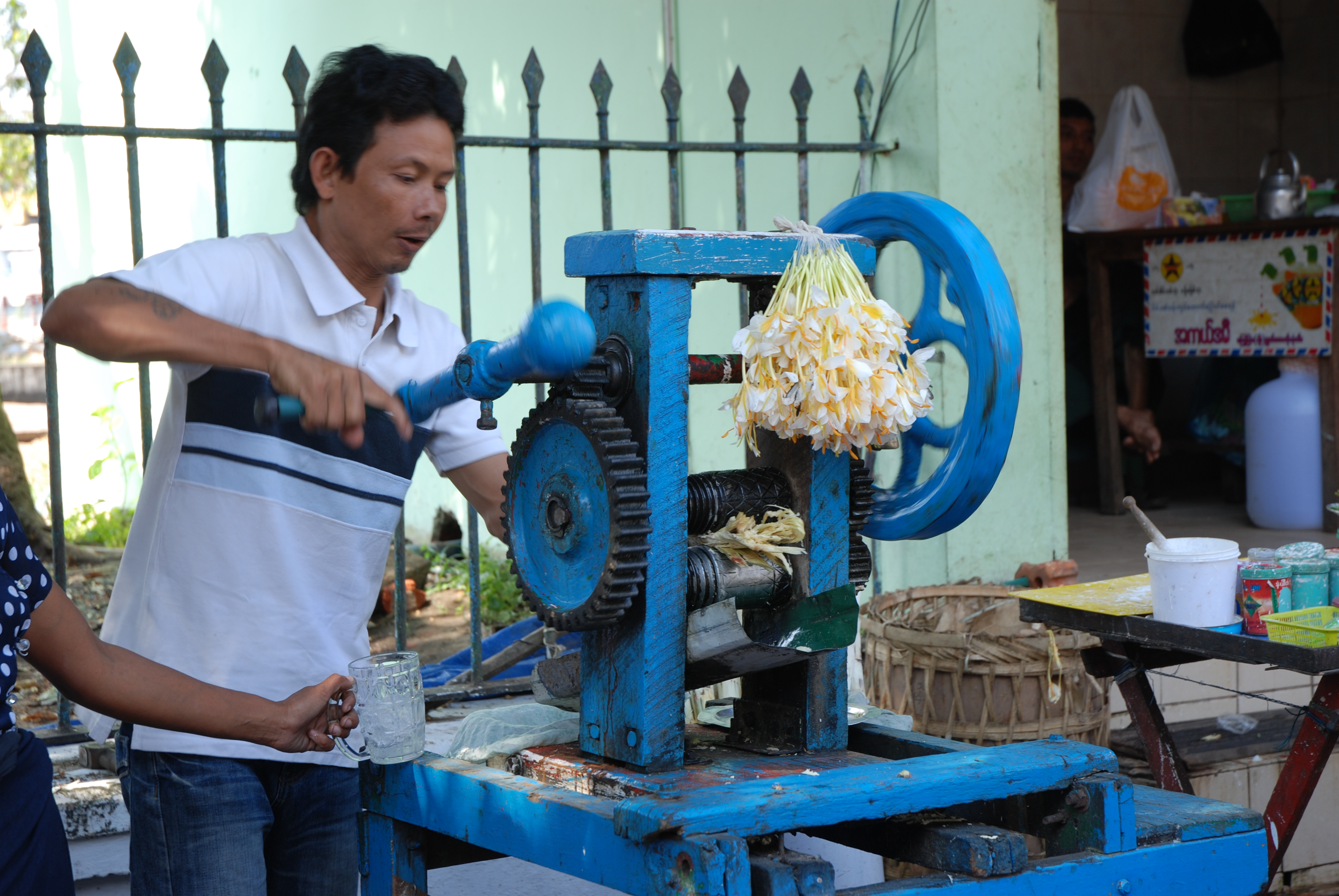
A Burmese street vendor in Yangon prepares sugarcane juice.

In Myanmar, sugarcane juice is known as kyan ye (ကြံရည်) and is available throughout the country. It is typically brewed during the summertime, and optionally blended with lime, jujube, or orange.

=== Pakistan ===
In 2019, the government of Pakistan declared sugarcane juice to be Pakistan's "national drink".

=== United States ===
In the United States, where the FDA regulates the description of ingredients on food labels, the term "evaporated cane juice" cannot be used because it misleads consumers to believe that cane juice is similar to fruit or vegetable juices. Instead, the FDA recommends "cane sugar" or another term determined by manufacturers who should "review the final guidance and consider whether their labeling terminology accurately describes the basic nature and characterizing properties of the sweetener used".

=== Vietnam ===
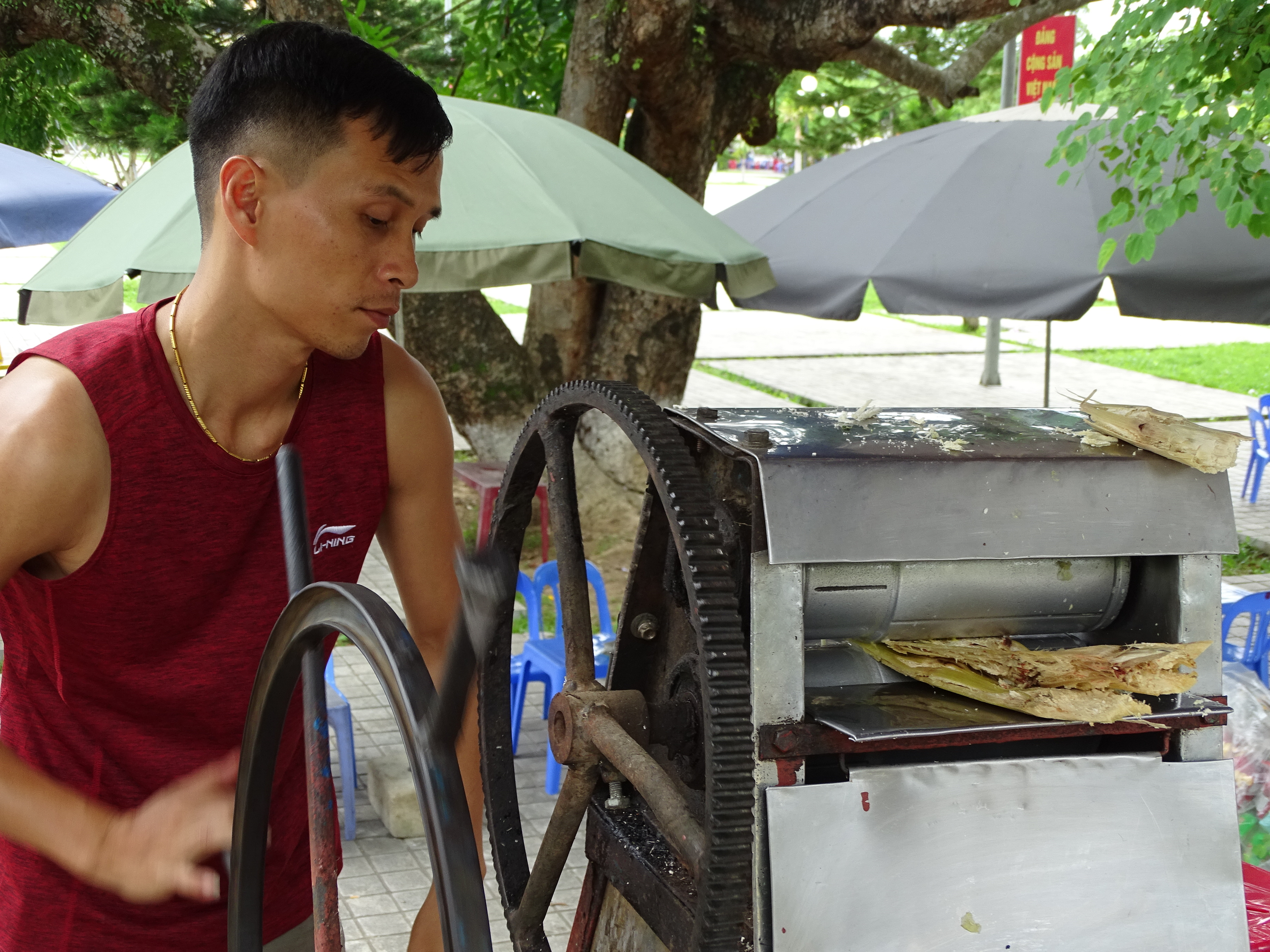
A man is squeezing sugarcane juice for guests in Điện Biên, Vietnam.

Sugarcane juice, known as nước mía or mía đá, is common in Vietnam as a drink. Other fruit juices may be added to balance the sweetness, such as kumquat or chanh muối. It used to be sold at street stalls in plastic bags, now in disposable plastic cups filled with ice or bottled.

== See also ==
- List of Indian drinks
- List of juices
