= El Ghanayem =

Human settlement in Egypt

El Ghanayem ϯⲙⲓⲛⲅⲁⲛⲓⲙ الغنايم
- Town
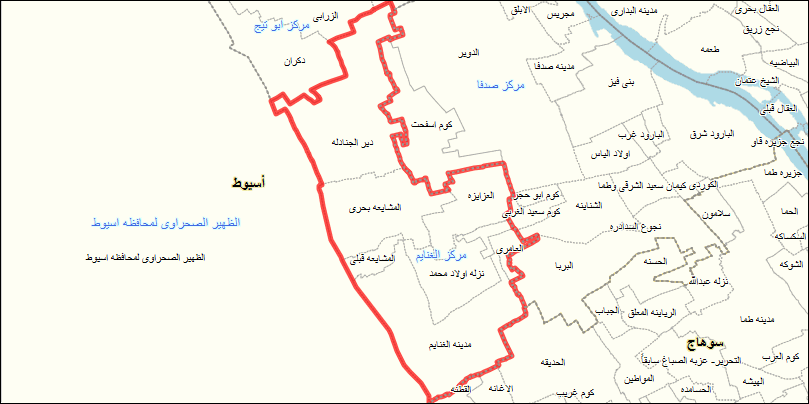
- Location in Asyut Governorate
- Coordinates: 31°18′N 30°18′E
- Country: Egypt
- Governorate: Asyut Governorate

Area
  - Total: 13.2 km^{2} (5.1 sq mi)

Population (2023)
  - Total: 75,361
  - Density: 5,710/km^{2} (14,800/sq mi)
- Time zone: UTC+2 (EET)
  - Summer (DST): UTC+3 (EEST)
- Postal code: 22748
- Area code: (+20) 045

El Ghanayem (Coptic: ϯⲙⲓⲛⲅⲁⲛⲓⲙ Diminganim) is a town in Egypt. It is located near the city of Abu Tig in the Asyut Governorate.

== See also ==
- List of cities and towns in Egypt
