= Abd El Gilil =

- Town
- Location in Egypt
- Coordinates: 29°39′N 31°22′E
- Country: Egypt
- Governorate: Giza Governorate
- Time zone: UTC+2 (EET)
  - Summer (DST): UTC+3 (EEST)

Abd El Gilil is a town in the Giza Governorate, Egypt. Abd El Gilil is approximately 69 km from Giza, the capital of the Giza Governorate, and 75 km from Cairo.
