= Idmo =

Coordinates: 28.14986°N 30.67951°E

Idmo (Arabic: إدمو, Coptic: ⲧⲙⲟⲩ) is a village which lies about 12 kilometres to the west of Minya city, the capital of Minya Governorate, upper Egypt.

The Arabic name of the village comes from Coptic which means "the island".

The population of this village, according to the last census in 2006, is 25,000. It is a peninsula, surrounded by the water of the Bahr Yussef from all the directions except the west. It is bound by Demsheer village from the east, Toukh village from the south, Hahia village from the north and Aljamala village from the west.

As in most of Egypt rural areas, the village is formed of many tribes: Abdalla, Awaisa, Rakaiba, Ayaida, jarkma, shorafaa, zaaira etc. The most famous tribe is Abdalla as it has national and international well-educated figures. The literacy rate in this village is about 50%. Although this rate is low in general, it is even lower in certain tribes. The highest literacy rate is in Abdalla tribe. A bridge over the yusof sea has helped the trade in Idmo village as it connected it directly to the east and made it easier to commute to the Alminia city itself.
