= Deir el-Gabrawi =

- Location in Egypt
- Coordinates: 27°20′N 31°06′E
- Country: Egypt
- Governorate: Asyut
- Time zone: UTC+2 (EET)
  - Summer (DST): UTC+3 (EEST)

Deir el-Gabrawi is a village in Upper Egypt. It is located on the east bank of the Nile, directly east of the city of Manfalut, in the Asyut Governorate with about 120 rock cut tombs, 16 of them with a decoration.

== Ancient necropolis ==
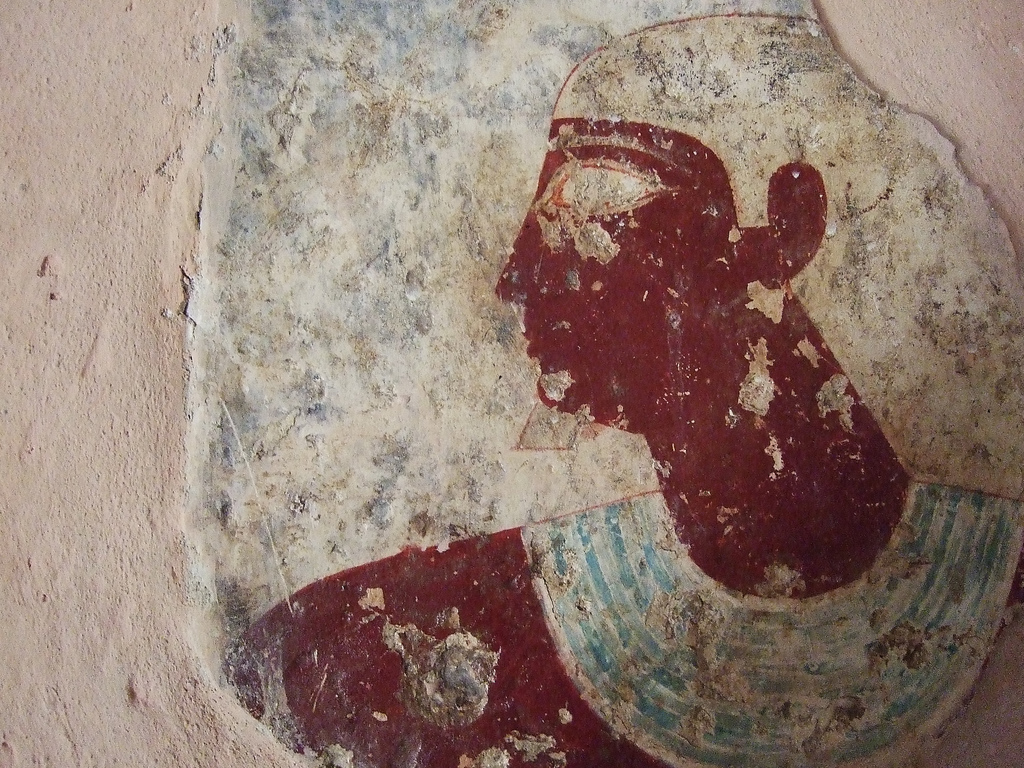
A painted relief from Ibi's 6th Dynasty tomb

During the 6th Dynasty, the powerful nomarchs of the 12th nome of Upper Egypt were buried in rock-cut tombs near Deir El Gabrawi. Some of these nomarchs held the title Great Overlord of the Abydene Nome, and so controlled a large area extending from the 8th nome (Abydos) to the 13th nome of Upper Egypt.

It is remarkable that some scenes in the tomb of one of these nomarchs, Ibi, occur again in the Theban tomb (TT36) of a man of the same name from the reign of Psammetichus I, about 1600 years later.

The tombs are known since the 19th century but were only fully recorded in 1900 by Norman de Garis Daviesl They were again the target of research and recording around 2000 under the supervision of Naguib Kanawati.

== Notable tombs ==
- N39 Henqu I, 6th Dynasty
- N46 Hemre II, 6th Dynasty
- N67 Henqu II, 6th Dynasty
- N72 Hemre, Isi. governor and vizier 6th Dynasty
- S8 Ibi, 6th Dynasty

== Literature ==
- Naguib Kanawati (2005): Deir el-Gebrawi. Vol. I: The Northern Cliff (= The Australian Centre for Egyptology, Reports. volume 23). Oxford.
- Naguib Kanawati: Deir El-Gebrawi. 2 The Southern Cliff: the Tomb of Ibi and Others (= The Australian Centre for Egyptology, Reports. volume 25). Aris & Phillips, Oxford 2007, ISBN 978-0-85668-808-9.
- Juan Carlos Moreno García, (2012), Deir el-Gabrawi. In Willeke Wendrich (ed.), UCLA Encyclopedia of Egyptology, Los Angeles. https://escholarship.org/uc/item/99j1g8zh

== See also ==
- List of ancient Egyptian sites, including sites of temples
