= Sahel Selim =

City in the Asyut Governorate of Egypt

Coordinates: 27.0543°N 31.335°E

Sahel Selim is a city in the Asyut Governorate of Egypt. In 2017 it had a population of 180,996 inhabitants. Sahel Salim is located at the East coast of the Nile at a 24 km distance south from the city of Asyuit. It is bordered on the East with the lands and desert plateaus uninhabited until the Red Sea Governorate, on the West with the Center Abutej, and the north center El Fatah and Badari center on south. Sahel Salim is characterized by its fruit gardens, some of its fruit production is exported abroad.

== History ==
Sahel Selim is the oldest center of Asyut Governorate and dates back to pre-pharaonic era.

== See also ==
- List of cities and towns in Egypt
