= Kom-el-Gir =

Archaeological site in Egypt

Kom-el-Gir is an archaeological site in the Western Delta of modern Egypt. The site lies about 5 km north-east of the ancient town Buto and is about 20 hectare large. The town is so far little researched. A geophysical survey, test excavations and drill borings have provided some information. There are two big enclosures, one perhaps for a temple and another one for a late Roman military camp. The overall plan of the settlement seems to follow a grid pattern. Pottery found on the surface dates mostly from the fourth to seventh century AD.

== See also ==
- List of ancient Egyptian sites, including sites of temples
