= Manqabadi =

Manqabadi (also spelled Manqbadi, Mankabadi, Mankbadi, among other variations) is an Egyptian surname and is a derivative of the city of Manqabad. It means "from Manqabad."

== People ==
Notable people with the surname include:

- Albert Selim El-Mankabadi, Egyptian rower
- Reda R. Mankbadi, professor
- Samir Mankabady, lawyer

== See also ==
- Manqabad, a town in Upper Egypt, near the city of Asyut
