= Manqabad =

Village in Asyut Governorate, Egypt

Manqabad منقباد
- Village
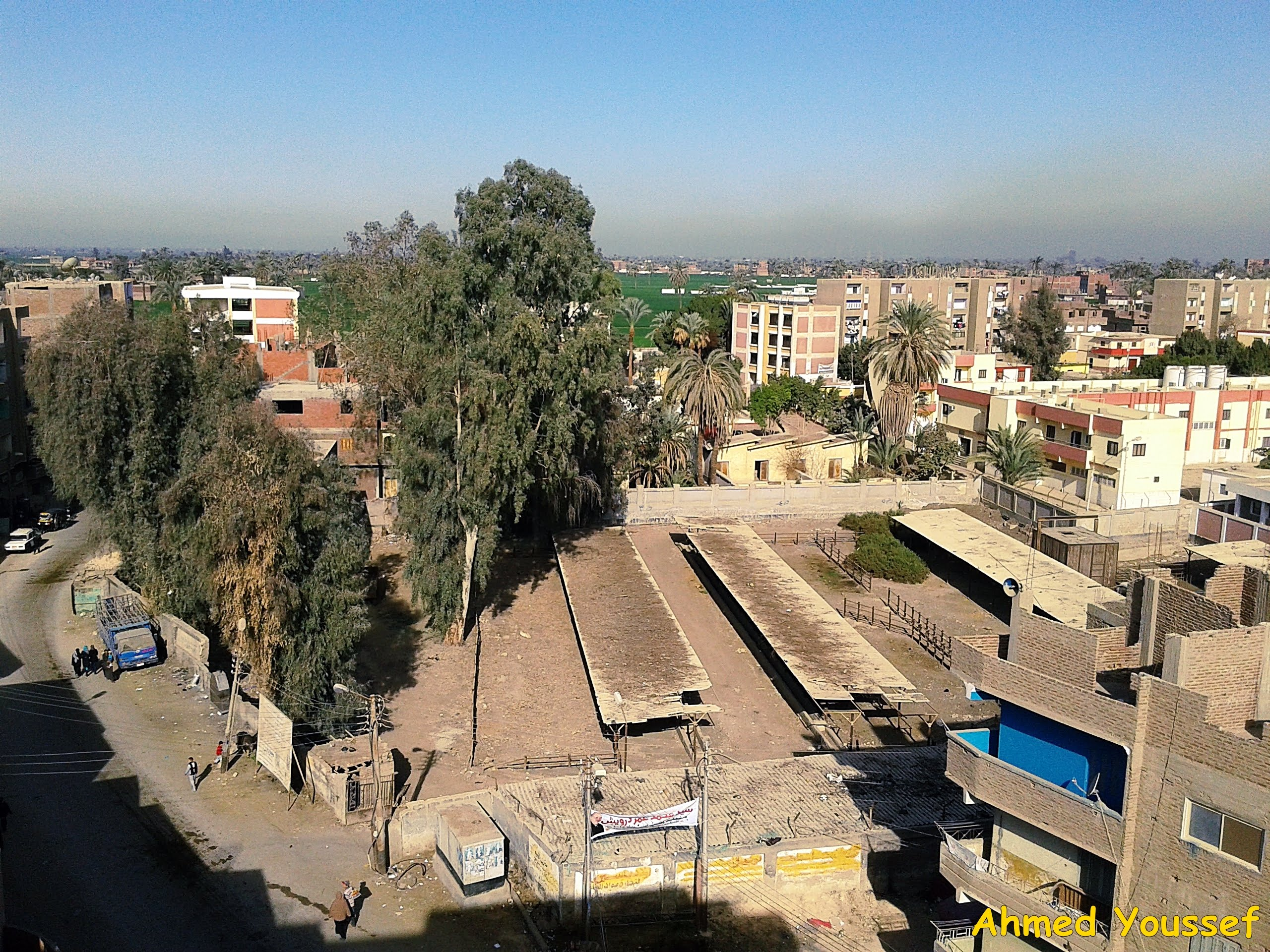

- Location in Egypt
- Coordinates: 27°12′10″N 31°06′25″E
- Country: Egypt
- Governorate: Asyut
- Time zone: UTC+2 (EST)

Manqabad also spelled Mankabad (Arabic: منقباد, from Coptic: ⲙⲁⲛⲕⲁⲡⲱⲧ, romanized: place of cup) is a town in Upper Egypt, near the city of Asyut. A military station was located in the town which was referred to as "beyond civilization", being the last vestige of the Nile River Valley before the southern desert. In the 1940s, the station had 3000 officers and soldiers, including a number of whom like Gamal Abdel Nasser, Khaled Mohieddin and Anwar Sadat who would become members of the Free Officers Movement. In 1965, an ancient Coptic site was accidentally found at Manqabad and major excavations were undertaken there in 1976, 1984, and 1995. Several churches and chapels dating from the 7th to 8th centuries were excavated.

Its ancient name was Khayet, and was the cult centre for the obscure ram-headed god Merymutef and his lioness-headed consort Ipipet. Worship of the god was active until the Ptolemaic era, based on a funerary statuette belonging to a man named Nebiry who was titled "first prophet of Merymutef lord of Khayet". Excavations undertaken by Ahmed Kamal in 1910 uncovered a block from a large building constructed in the reign of Akhenaten during the Eighteenth Dynasty of the New Kingdom.

== Surname ==
Manqabad is also the town of origin of the Manqabadi (sometimes spelled "Mankabady" or "Mankbadi") family, which was formerly one of the oldest Upper Egyptian nobilities.

== Bibliography ==
- Du Bois, Shirley Graham (1972), Gamal Abdel Nasser, son of the Nile: a biography, The Third Press, ISBN 978-0-87395-080-0
- Immerzeel, Mat (2004), Coptic studies on the threshold of a new millennium: proceedings of the Seventh International Congress of Coptic Studies, Peeters Publishers, ISBN 90-429-1409-2
- Zecchi, Marco (1996). "In Search of Merymutef, « Lord of Khayet »". Aegyptus. 76 (1/2): 7–14. ISSN 0001-9046.
