= Sanabo =

Village in Asyut Governorate, Egypt

Sanabo صنبو
- Location in Egypt
- Coordinates: 27.493°N 30.791°E
- Country: Egypt
- Governorate: Asyut Governorate
- Time zone: UTC+2 (EST)

Sanabo (Arabic: صنبو, Coptic: ⲥⲉⲛⲟⲩⲏⲃ Senouab), also known as Sanbu, is a village in Asyut Governorate, Egypt. In 2006 it had a population of 36,333.

Sanabo is home to the Church of St. George Monastery. According to Coptic church beliefs, The Holy Family traveled to Sanabo.
