= Phoibammon of Preht =

Saint Phoibammon
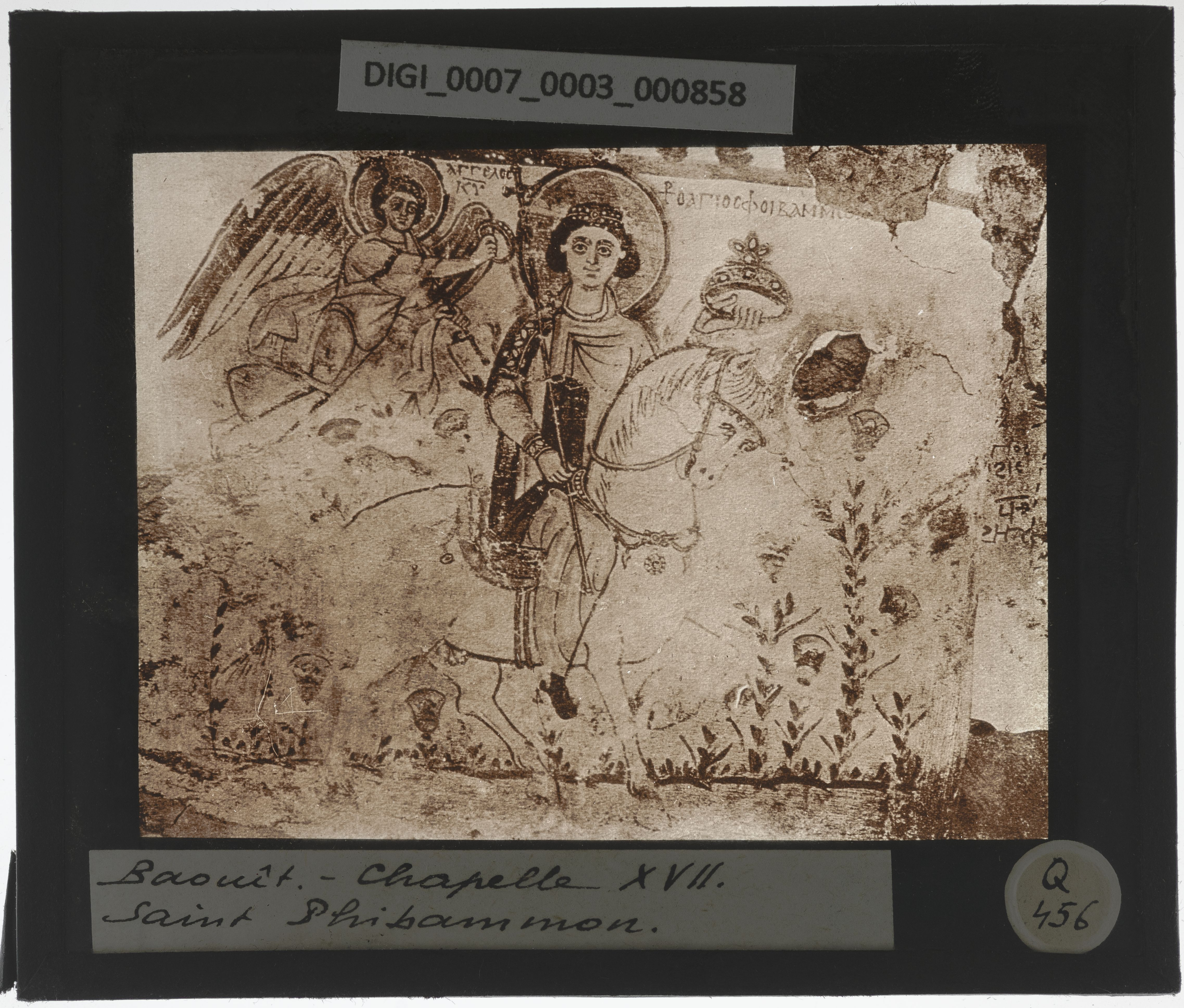

Martyr
- Born: 4th century Touho, Egypt
- Died: May 26 (4th century); Siowt, Egypt
- Venerated in: Coptic Orthodox Church; Armenian Apostolic Church; Ethiopian Orthodox Church; Syriac Orthodox Church; Oriental Orthodoxy
- Major shrine: Abnub

Phoibammon of Preht (Coptic: ⲁⲡⲁ ⲫⲟⲓⲃⲁⲙⲙⲱⲛ, Arabic: بيفام الطحاوي, romanized: Bifām al-Tahawi) was a Christian sentry stationed at the camp of Preht in Thebaid during the prefecture of Clodius Culcianus in the reign of Emperor Diocletian (303-307/8). He defied Diocletian's edict that required people to pay homage to pagan gods and as a result, he was executed in Siowt on May 26.

Phoibammon of Preht is sometimes confused with another martyr named Phoibammon who hailed from Wushem and was martyred near Tkow. These two individuals with the same name have separate accounts and traditions associated with them. The confusion is further compounded by the existence of various Coptic fragments that may belong to different editions or versions of their respective martyrologies.

== Biography ==
Phoibammon was born in Touho. His Greek mother was named Sarah, but his father's name remains unknown. At the time of his execution, Phoibammon was around thirty years old and had been a Christian for four years.

Phoibammon's martyrdom is described in an intact martyrology manuscript, along with related fragments and an Arabic version. The martyrology includes accounts of his miracles performed after his death, recorded by Colluthus. The identity of other officials mentioned in the account is uncertain.

The martyrology also includes the stories of five other soldier-martyrs who were imprisoned and executed alongside Phoibammon in Asyut: Ischurion, Orsenuphis of Sne, Belphius, Origen, and Peter of Souan. Their accounts are mentioned briefly in the Synaxarion. Ischurion, in particular, is known to have churches dedicated to his name in modern Egypt (al-Bayahu, ash-Shanaynah).

== Legacy ==
In Thebes, two monasteries were dedicated to a martyr named Phoibammon. One was located between Djeme and Ermont on the west bank, while the other was constructed on the uppermost terrace of Hatshepsut's temple at Deir el-Bahari. It is uncertain which of the two martyrs the monasteries were dedicated to. The Theban recension of the Synaxarion gives more prominence to the nobleman Phoibammon, suggesting that he may have been the tutelary saint of the Theban monastery. However, the exact connection remains uncertain.

A church in Abnub bears his name.
