= Abu Sidhum =

- Town
- Location in Egypt
- Coordinates: 28°20′24″N 30°37′26″E
- Country: Egypt
- Governorate: Minya
- Time zone: UTC+2 (EET)
  - Summer (DST): UTC+3 (EEST)

Abu Sidhum is a town in the Minya Governorate in Egypt. It is located on the west bank of the Nile.

Approximately 12 miles east of Abu Sidhum, rock formations were found in 2013 that are claimed to be highly eroded pyramids. The area was visited and is claimed to be "hiding an ancient site." The site was discovered by noted satellite archaeology researcher Angela Micol from the USA.
