= Durunka =

Durunka درنكة ⲧⲣⲟⲛⲭⲏ
- Location in Egypt
- Coordinates: 27°9′32″N 31°11′42″E
- Country: Egypt
- Governorate: Asyut Governorate
- Time zone: UTC+2 (EET)
  - Summer (DST): UTC+3 (EEST)

Durunka (Arabic: درنكة, Coptic: ⲧⲣⲟⲛⲭⲏ Coptic pronunciation: [təroːnkʰə]), alternatively spelled Dronka, is an Upper Egyptian town, located on the west bank of the Nile, in the Asyut Governorate.

== History ==
The Holy family visited Durunka on their flight into Egypt and the nearby monasteries at Dayr Durunka commemorate it.

In 1994 during severe thunderstorms over the area that caused much damage and flash flooding, a flash of lightning ignited three oil storage tanks each holding about 5,000 tons of aircraft or diesel fuel. These tanks were located on a railway line that subsequently collapsed as floodwaters built up behind it. The fuel caught fire from the lightning strike and the floodwaters swept the blazing fuel into the village, killing approximately 469 people, the world's yet highest confirmed death toll from a single incident lightning strike.
