= El Salamuni =

El Salamuni السلاموني ⲯⲓⲛⲉⲙⲟⲩⲛ
- Location in Egypt
- Coordinates: 26°22′12″N 31°38′24″E
- Country: Egypt
- Governorate: Sohag
- Time zone: UTC+2 (EET)
  - Summer (DST): UTC+3 (EEST)

El Salamuni (Arabic: السلاموني, Coptic: ⲯⲓⲛⲉⲙⲟⲩⲛ Psinemoun) is a village in the Upper Egyptian Sohag Governorate. It is located northeast of the city of Akhmim.

== Overview ==
El Salamuni comprises a rock-cut chapel dedicated to the god Min. The edifice was created by the first priest of Min, Nakhtmin. About 1,000 years later, the chief priest of Min, Harma'kheru, added depictions of Ptolemy II Philadelphus.

== See also ==
- List of ancient Egyptian sites, including sites of temples
- Akhmim
