= Lagona =

Village in South Sinai Governorate, Egypt

Lagona لاجونا
- Village
- Location within Sinai Location within Egypt
- Coordinates: 28.489979°N 34.500546°E
- Country: Egypt
- Governorate: South Sinai
- Markaz: Dahab
- Time zone: UTC+2 (EGY)
  - Summer (DST): UTC+3 (EEST)

Lagona (Arabic: لاجونا) is a village located close to the centre of Dahab in the South Sinai governorate of the Sinai Peninsula in Egypt. The nearby town of Dahab is an hour south from Sharm El Sheikh International Airport.
