= Sendion =

Sendion, also spelled Sendiun or Sendyoun (Arabic: سنديون), is a village in northeastern Egypt located in Qalyubia Governorate belonging to the town of Qalyub about 20 km north of Cairo.

== Agriculture ==
Sendion is located in the rich farmland of the southern part of the Nile Delta and is well irrigated by canals leading off the Delta Barrage. Most of the agricultural land on Sendion is famous for its citrus orchards. It is also famous for cultivation of onions next to all types of crops as it is the first village in poultry.

== Industry ==
In ancient times, Sendion was a small village named Send yun, which means (in hieroglyphs) the Kingdom of Leon or yun. Today it is famous for its preserved foods industry and as an industrial and agricultural village. It lies on the rail network that radiates north from Cairo.

== Geography ==
Geographically, Sendion is a model village which is famous for being densely populated. It is bordered on the north by Qaha and on east by Tanan village and separated by a railway and the agricultural main road to Alexandria. Sendion is bordered on the west by agricultural villages, such as Sendbis and a little village on the south called Qalama.
