= Kafr Shubra Zangi =

Village in Sharqia Governorate, Egypt

Kafr Shubra Zangi كفر شبرا زنجي
- Village
- Location in Egypt
- Coordinates: 30°26′44″N 31°00′03″E
- Country: Egypt
- Governorate: Monufia
- District: El Bagour
- Time zone: UTC+2 (EET)
  - Summer (DST): UTC+3 (EEST)

Kafr Shubra Zangi (Arabic: كفر شبرا زنجي) is a village in El Bagour center in the Monufia governorate, Egypt.

Located in the Nile Delta, the area has had rising groundwater levels. It is about 30 miles northwest of Cairo and 81 miles southeast of Alexandria.
