= Idfa =

Idfa إدفا
- Village
- Location in Egypt
- Coordinates: 26°34′21″N 31°38′20″E
- Country: Egypt
- Governorate: Sohag
- Time zone: UTC+2 (EET)
  - Summer (DST): UTC+3 (EEST)

Idfa (Arabic: إدفا) is a village in Sohag Governorate in Upper Egypt located 6.4 km (4.0 mi) from the nearby city of Sohag. In antiquity, it was known by the ancient Egyptians as Iteb, then it was named by the Greeks as Itos (Ancient Greek: Ἰτος).

== Location ==
The Greek spelling Itos, which was derived from the Egyptian Iteb and formed the root of the Arabic name Idfa, was found on several ostracas found in today's Idfa. In addition, a poultry farmer is named "Horo(n)mephis" on two of these ostracas, which represents the Greek form of Horus Iunmutef. An inscription on the outer wall of the temple of Edfu indicates that Iteb was a cult place of the aforementioned Horus Iunmutef. On the south wall of the Pronaos, Horus Iunmutef can be seen in this context as "the cleaner of the great house of Horus from Iteb, who is in his barge" at the head of the convoy of Horus. From the representations on the north wall of the Mammisi of temple of Dendera, further references to the place Chemmis (modern Akhmim) have been obtained, which allowed an assignment of Iteb in the immediate vicinity to Chemmis. In addition, Osiris bears the title "Lord of Iteb".

== Hieroglyphs ==
M17 X1 R7 N21 X1 O49 or M17 X1 R7 M44 X1 O49
jtp(t)
in hieroglyphs
Era: Old Kingdom
(2686–2181 BC)

== Bibliography ==
- François Daumas. Les mammisis de Dendara. Paris University, Paris. 1955.
- Dieter Kurth. Die Inschriften des Tempels von Edfu. Abteilung I Übersetzung. Band 2: Edfou VII. Harrassowitz, Wiesbaden. 2004. ISBN 3-447-05016-0
- Serge Sauneron. Bulletin de l'Institut français d'archéologie Orientale (BIFAO): Edfou. Vol. 62. Cairo. 1964.
