= El Khasos =

El Khasos الخصوص
- Location in Egypt
- Coordinates: 30.133696°N 31.357183°E
- Country: Egypt
- Governorate: Cairo
- Time zone: UTC+2 (EET)
  - Summer (DST): UTC+3 (EEST)

El Khasos (Arabic: الخصوص) is a city in Cairo Governorate, Egypt.
