= El Sahel Bahari =

El Sahel Bahari الساحل بحري
- city
- Location in Egypt
- Coordinates: 26.266017°N 31.986423°E
- Country: Egypt
- Governorate: Sohag
- Time zone: UTC+2 (EET)
  - Summer (DST): UTC+3 (EEST)

El Sahel Bahari (Arabic: الساحل بحري) is a village in the Sohag Governorate, Egypt.
