= Balat, Egypt =

Balat بلاط
- Town
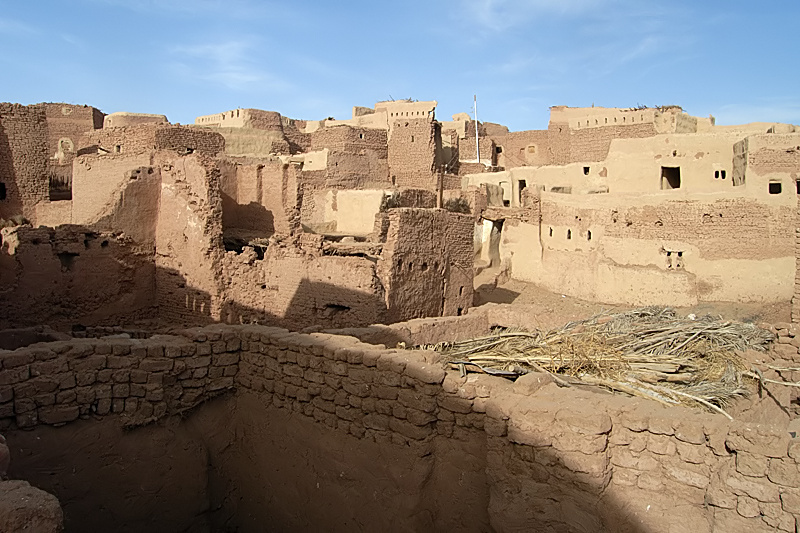
- Old village

- Location in Egypt
- Coordinates: 25.564031°N 29.265819°E
- Country: Egypt
- Governorate: New Valley

Population (2006)
  - Total: 3,794
- Time zone: UTC+2 (EET)
  - Summer (DST): UTC+3 (EEST)

Balat (Arabic: بلاط, from Latin: palātium, lit. 'palace'), is a small town in the New Valley Governorate, Egypt. Its population was estimated at 3,700 people in 2006.

== Geography ==
The town lies in the eastern part of the Dakhhla Oasis in Egypt. Three kilometers to the northeast at Ain 'Asil (Arabic عين أصيل) was a settlement from the Old Kingdom. The northern part of the settlement was surrounded by a wall. There was the palace of the governor (head of the oasis) and other administrative buildings. In the south, among other things, there were significant remains of houses and potteries.

== History ==
The place exists probably only since the second half of the 14th century. The name Balāṭ el-Malik, occasionally used by locals, means ruler's seat. The old village center is located on the south side of the trunk road to Muṭ, the "modern" settlement extends on the north side.
