= Abu Tig =

Abu Tig Ⲁⲡⲟⲑⲏⲕⲏ أبو تيج
- City
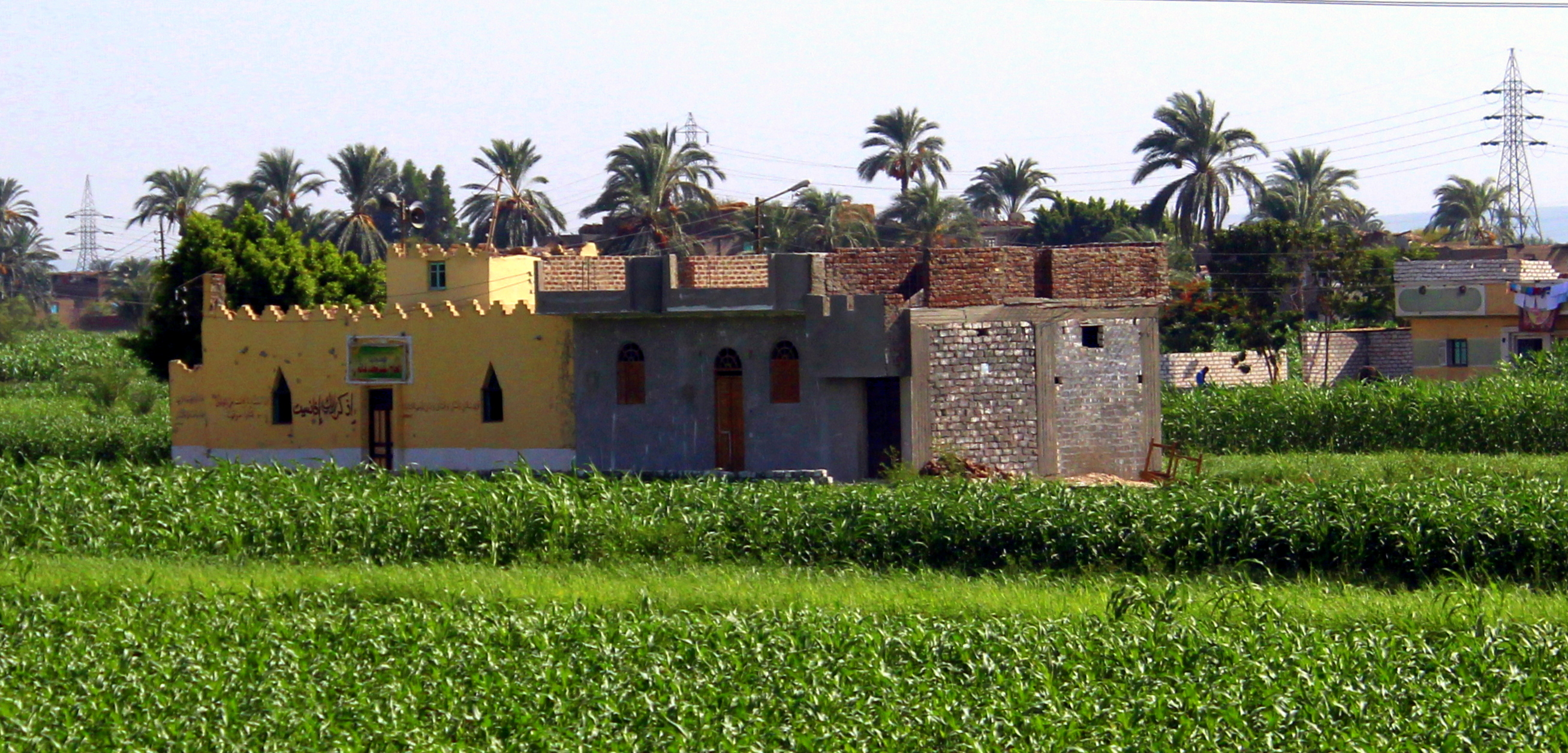
- Abu Tig, Egypt

- Location in Egypt
- Coordinates: 27°02′12″N 31°19′41″E
- Country: Egypt
- Governorate: Asyut

Area
  - Total: 13.9 km^{2} (5.4 sq mi)
- Elevation: 54 m (177 ft)

Population (2023)
  - Total: 112,077
  - Density: 8,060/km^{2} (20,900/sq mi)
- Time zone: UTC+2 (EET)
  - Summer (DST): UTC+3 (EEST)

G40 E23 D36 O1 O49
pꜣšnꜥ
in hieroglyphs

Abu Tig (Arabic: أبو تيج; Coptic: Ⲧⲁⲡⲟⲑⲏⲕⲏ Tapothēkē Coptic pronunciation: [təpoˈtʰeːⲕə]) is a city in the Asyut Governorate of Egypt. Located on the west bank of the Nile, it has an estimated population of 112,077 inhabitants as of 2023.

Abu Tig is the third largest city in Asyut Governorate in Egypt after Asyut itself and Dairut. Abu-Tig is very famous for herbs and botanicals all over Egypt. In the Ancient era, Abu-Tig was and is still considered as the central hub for fresh and natural fruits and vegetables as well as herbs and spices. It is not only a commercial city but is famous for El Farghal Mosque as well. El Farghal Mosque, with its twin minarets, is the largest mosque in Upper Egypt. Many people come to Abu Tig every year in July to visit El Farghal Mosque and celebrate at the El Farghal fair. During holidays and feasts, people from all over Upper Egypt come to Abu Tig to visit its zoo, called "Nasser Zoo".

== History ==
Abu Tig is an ancient city distinguished by its ancient-times archaeology, including an obelisk with a depiction of Queen and Pharaoh Hatshepsut. Gauthier adds that its ancient Egyptian name was "Pa-shna" which translates to "The store" where the Greeks translated the name to "Apotheke" (Ancient Greek: Ἀποθήκή) and hence came the modern name of the city, it was a place of worship of Hathor. Palaces and churches in Abu Tig date back to ancient Coptic, and Islamic eras. During the Napoleonic Era, tourists looking for fine belly-dancing could find belly-dancers in Abu Tig. A school for training belly-dancers existed there until public belly-dancing was banned. In the early 19th century slaves from Sudan were castrated near Abu Tig, mainly by Coptic priests. Abu Tig has a number of bars that cater to tourists, including divers.

== Geography ==
Abu Tig has many subordinate villages like: Baqor, Nazlat Baqor, El Felio, El Nekhila, Bani Semei, El Zayara, El Zawia, Dekran, El Zarabi, Dweina, Nazlat Dweina, Abu El Hareth, Abu Khors and El Balayza.

=== Climate ===
Abu Tig is classified by Köppen-Geiger climate classification system as hot desert (BWh), as the rest of Egypt.

Climate data for Bilbeis
Month	Jan	Feb	Mar	Apr	May	Jun	Jul	Aug	Sep	Oct	Nov	Dec	Year
Mean daily maximum °C (°F)	20.7 (69.3)	22.8 (73.0)	27.1 (80.8)	32.2 (90.0)	35.9 (96.6)	37.5 (99.5)	37.2 (99.0)	37.1 (98.8)	34.1 (93.4)	31.0 (87.8)	27.1 (80.8)	22.2 (72.0)	30.4 (86.8)
Daily mean °C (°F)	13.3 (55.9)	14.9 (58.8)	18.5 (65.3)	23.2 (73.8)	27.3 (81.1)	29.4 (84.9)	29.5 (85.1)	29.7 (85.5)	27.4 (81.3)	24.6 (76.3)	19.8 (67.6)	15 (59)	22.7 (72.9)
Mean daily minimum °C (°F)	6 (43)	7 (45)	9.9 (49.8)	14.3 (57.7)	18.7 (65.7)	21.4 (70.5)	21.9 (71.4)	22.4 (72.3)	20.8 (69.4)	18.2 (64.8)	12.6 (54.7)	7.8 (46.0)	15.1 (59.2)
Average precipitation mm (inches)	0 (0)	0 (0)	0 (0)	0 (0)	0 (0)	0 (0)	0 (0)	0 (0)	0 (0)	0 (0)	1 (0.0)	1 (0.0)	2 (0)
Source: Climate-Data.org

== Notable people ==
- Mohamed Ahmed Farghali Pasha
- Louis Gris
