= Mohamed Mustagab =

Egyptian novelist (1938–2006)

Mohamed Mustagab (1938–2006) was an Egyptian novelist and short story writer.

== Early life ==
He was born in the town of Dayrut in Upper Egypt. He had little formal education and was involved in the construction of the Aswan High Dam in the 1960s. He eventually turned to journalism and writing, and rose to the position of director at the Academy of the Arabic Language in Cairo.

== Career ==
As a writer, he published his first short story in the pages of al-Hilal magazine in 1968. He published several volumes of fiction, including novels and short stories. His most noted work is The Secret History of Numan Abd al-Hafiz (1984). This short novel won the Egyptian State Incentive Award and was selected as one of the top 100 Arabic novels by the Arab Writers Union. It has been translated into English by Humphrey T. Davies, and was included in Tales of Dayrut (AUC Press, 2008), the only book-length work by Mustagab available in English translation. It was also turned into a play and staged in Cairo in 2001.
