= El Ghawaben =

Village in Damietta Governorate, Egypt

Al Ghawwābīn
- Location in Egypt
- Coordinates: 31°19′52″N 31°45′34″E
- Country: Egypt
- Governorate: Damietta Governorate
- Time zone: UTC+2 (EET)
  - Summer (DST): UTC+3 (EEST)

El Ghawaben is a village about 4 km from Faraskur, Egypt and 15 km from Damietta. The village has a hospital and two primary schools, one of which is exclusively for girls.
