= Tummwah, Giza =

Tummwah is a village in the Giza Governorate in Egypt. Also spelled as "Tamwah", it is a Coptic old name that the village is keeping from the Old Egyptian name.

According to the 2006 census, the village had 21,689 residents, 11,212 males and 10,477 females.
