= El Thour =

Coordinates: 28.731°N 33.629°E

Location of El Thour in Egypt

El Thour is a settlement in Egypt.
