= Kafr El Hubi =

Village in Sharqia Governorate, Egypt

Kafr El Hubi كفر الهوبي
- Village
- Location in Egypt
- Coordinates: 30°39′48″N 31°47′47″E
- Country: Egypt
- Governorate: Sharqia
- District: Faqous
- Time zone: UTC+2 (EET)
  - Summer (DST): UTC+3 (EEST)

Kafr El Hubi (Arabic: كفر الهوبي) is a village in the Faqous administrative division of the Sharqia Governorate, Egypt. The village is named after the El Hubi family, the oldest and the biggest in the village.
