= Hafez Ibrahim =

Egyptian poet

Mohamed Hafez Ibrahim
- محمد حافظ إبراهيم
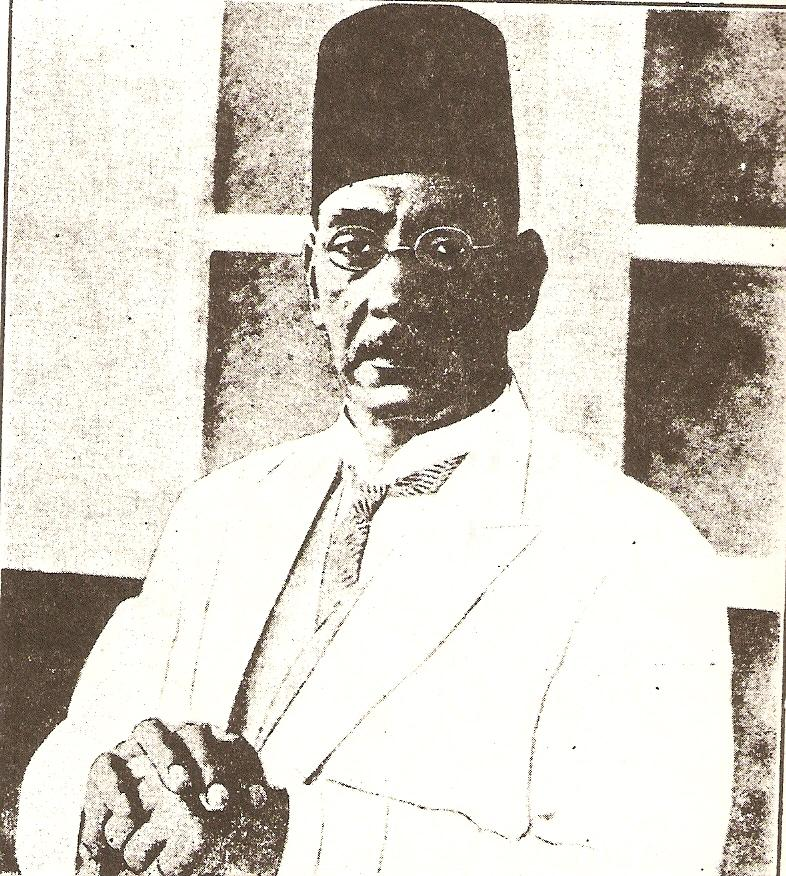
- Born: February 24, 1872; Dairut, Egypt
- Died: June 21, 1932 (aged 60); Cairo, Egypt

Mohamed Hafez Ibrahim (Arabic: محمد حافظ إبراهيم, ALA-LC: Muḥammad Ḥāfiẓ Ibrāhīm; 1871–1932) was an Egyptian poet of the early 20th century. He was dubbed the "Poet of the Nile", and sometimes the "Poet of the People", for his political commitment to the poor. His poetry took on the concerns of the majority of ordinary Egyptians, including women’s rights, poverty, education, as well as his criticism of the British Empire and foreign occupation.

He was one of several Egyptian poets who revived Classical Arabic poetry during the latter half of the 19th century. While still using the classical Arabic system of meter and rhyme, these poets wrote to express new ideas and feelings unknown to the classical poets. Hafez is noted for writing poems on political and social commentary.

== Early life ==
Hafez was born in 1872 in Dayrut, in Egypt. His father was an Egyptian engineer and his mother was Turkish. After his father’s death, at the age of four, Hafez was sent to live with his maternal uncle in Tanta where he received his primary school education. He then moved to Cairo to live with his mother and an uncle, where he completed his secondary education. After his mother died, Hafez moved back to Tanta and worked alongside Egyptian Nationalist lawyer Mohamed Abou Shadi; here, he discovered numerous literary books and became familiar with prominent leaders of the Egyptian National Movement.

== Career ==
In 1888, Hafez attended the Military Academy and graduated three years later as a lieutenant. He was then appointed by the Ministry of Interior, and, in 1896, he was deployed to Sudan as part of Egypt’s Sudan campaign. There, Hafez and several of his colleagues were involved in a rebellion against the mistreatment of the Sudanese, whereupon Hafez was court-martialed and sent back to Egypt.

By 1911, Hafez was appointed the head of the literary section in the Dar al Kutub al Masriyah (the Egyptian National Library), and the Minister of Education bestowed upon him the title "Bey" which provided Hafez with financial stability. Thereafter, he began to devote more time to literature and poetry. Hafez joined a circle of neo-classical artists of modern Arab poetry, such as Ahmad Shawqi and Mahmoud Samy El Baroudy, in imitating the Arabic classical writing style of meter and rhyme.

=== Works ===
Many poems were written by Hafez, for example:

- Albasūka al-dimāʾ fawq al-dimāʾ, ألبسوك الدماء فوق الدماء (They've dressed you in blood upon blood).
- Yā sayyidī wa imāmī, يا سيدي و إمامي (O master and imam).
- Shakartu jamīl ṣunʿikum, شكرت جميل صنعكم (I've thanked your favor).
- Maṣr tatakallam ʿan nafsihā, مصر تتكلم عن نفسها (Egypt talks about herself).
- Lī kasāʾ anʿam bihi min kasāʾ, لي كساء أنعم به من كساء (I've a dress, and what an excellent dress).
- Qul li-l-raʾīs adāma Allāh dawlatahu,قل للرئيس أدام الله دولته (Tell the President that God has extended the life of his state).
- Translation of Les Misérables by Victor Hugo, 1903

== Memorials ==
There is a statue of Hafez, sculpted by Faruq Ibrahim, on the Gezira Island.

== See also ==
- List of Egyptian writers
