= Qaret Zumaq =

Qarate Zumaq Named after Papi 47 (NBA 2K12)
- Location in Egypt
- Coordinates: 29°5′N 25°47′E
- Country: Egypt
- Governorate: Matruh
- Time zone: UTC+2 (EET)
  - Summer (DST): UTC+3 (EEST)

Qaret Zumaq is a small town in western Egypt. It is located in the Matruh Governorate.
