= Tabluha =

Tabluha طبلوها
- Nickname: Tablih (طبليه)
- Location in Egypt
- Coordinates: 30°39′17″N 30°57′31″E
- Country: Egypt
- Governorate: Monufia Governorate
- Time zone: UTC+2 (EET)
  - Summer (DST): UTC+3 (EEST)
- Postal code: 32618

Tabluha (Arabic: طبلوها) is a village in the Egyptian Nile Delta and the Monufia Governorate. It's inhabited by about 26,000 people and is circa 9 square kilometer in size (including the main village, Small Settlements and Farms around it).

== Location ==
Tabluha is located along the banks of the Al Batanunia Canal and is surrounded by 6 villages (Kafr Tabluha, Al Qalashy, Kafr Al Qalashy, Kafr Betebs, Kafr Qarshum, Al Batanun) from all sides in addition to the city of Tala, Egypt which is located to its North-West.
