= Dairut =

Dairut ديروط ⲧⲉⲣⲱⲧ
- City
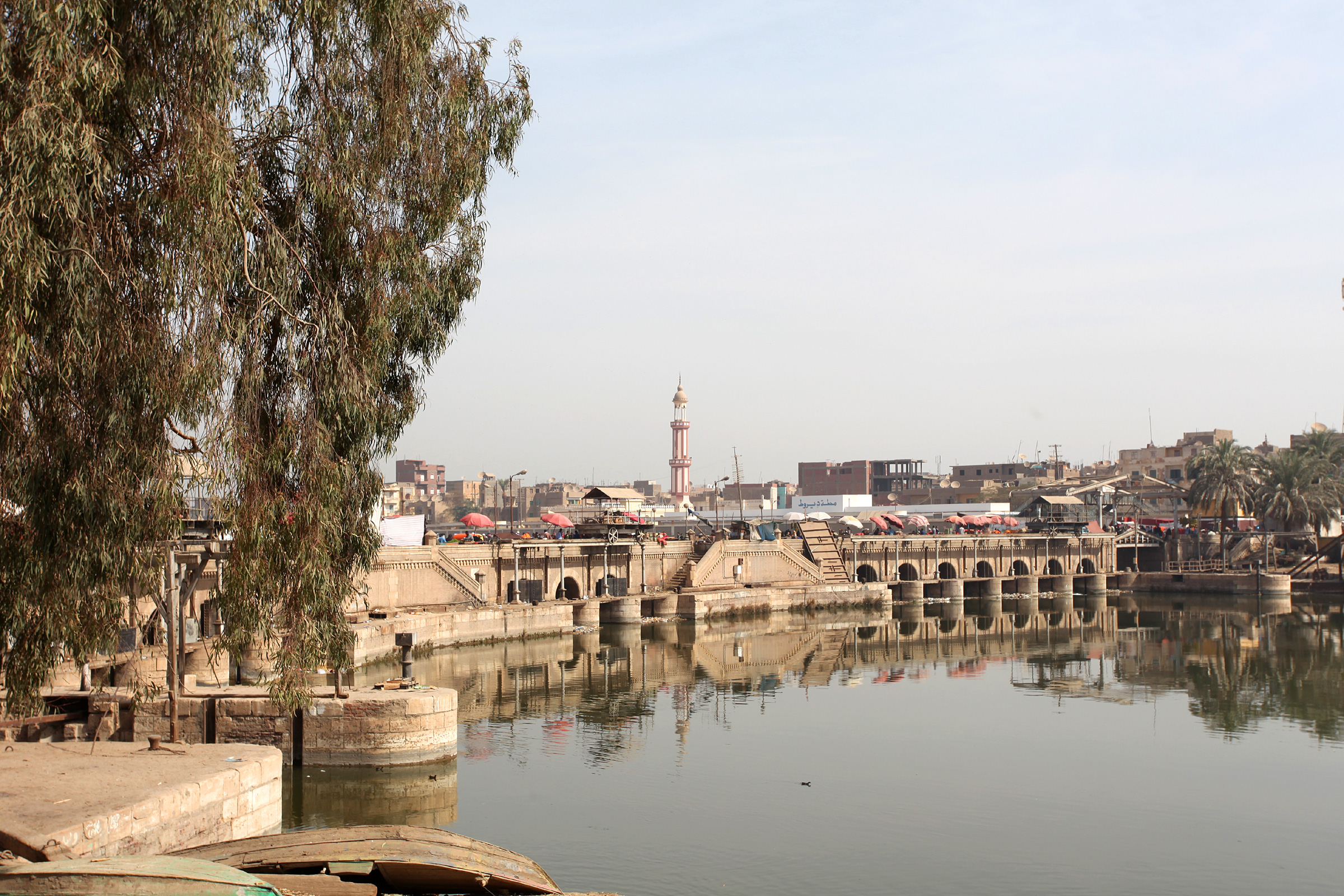

- Location in Egypt
- Coordinates: 27°34′N 30°49′E
- Country: Egypt
- Governorate: Asyut

Area
  - Total: 88.2 sq mi (228.4 km^{2})
- Elevation: 144 ft (44 m)

Population (2023)
  - Total: 680,817
  - Density: 7,720/sq mi (2,981/km^{2})
- Time zone: UTC+2 (EET)
  - Summer (DST): UTC+3 (EEST)

Dairut (Arabic: ديروط; Coptic: ⲧⲉⲣⲱⲧ terōt Coptic pronunciation: [dæˈroːt]) is a city in Egypt. It is located on the west bank of the Nile, in the Asyut Governorate. This is the point where the Nile divides, and a branch wanders off and eventually ends up in the Faiyum.

== Climate ==
Köppen-Geiger climate classification system classifies its climate as hot desert (BWh).

Climate data for Dairut
Month	Jan	Feb	Mar	Apr	May	Jun	Jul	Aug	Sep	Oct	Nov	Dec	Year
Mean daily maximum °C (°F)	21.2 (70.2)	23.3 (73.9)	26.6 (79.9)	31.6 (88.9)	34.7 (94.5)	35.6 (96.1)	35.5 (95.9)	35.1 (95.2)	32.6 (90.7)	31 (88)	26.8 (80.2)	22.3 (72.1)	29.7 (85.5)
Daily mean °C (°F)	12.4 (54.3)	14.2 (57.6)	17.2 (63.0)	21.9 (71.4)	25.6 (78.1)	27.1 (80.8)	27.5 (81.5)	27.4 (81.3)	25.3 (77.5)	23.2 (73.8)	18.6 (65.5)	14.3 (57.7)	21.2 (70.2)
Mean daily minimum °C (°F)	3.6 (38.5)	5.1 (41.2)	7.8 (46.0)	12.3 (54.1)	16.6 (61.9)	18.7 (65.7)	19.6 (67.3)	19.8 (67.6)	18.1 (64.6)	15.4 (59.7)	10.5 (50.9)	6.4 (43.5)	12.8 (55.1)
Average precipitation mm (inches)	0 (0)	1 (0.0)	1 (0.0)	0 (0)	0 (0)	0 (0)	0 (0)	0 (0)	0 (0)	0 (0)	0 (0)	1 (0.0)	3 (0)
Source: Climate-Data.org, altitude: 47m

== Notable people ==
- Hafez Ibrahim
- Mohamed Mustagab
- Farghali Abdel Hafiz
