= Saft El Laban =

Saft We Laban صفط ولبن
- Location in Egypt Saft We Laban (Egypt)
- Coordinates: 30.025631°N 31.165366°E
- Country: Egypt
- Governorate: Giza Governorate
- Elevation: 27 m (89 ft)

Population (2006)
  - Total: 104,547
- Time zone: UTC+2 (EET)
  - Summer (DST): UTC+3 (EEST)

Saft we Laban (Arabic: صفط ولبن) is a city in Giza Governorate, Egypt.
