= N. de Garis Davies =

British husband-and-wife Egyptologists

Norman de Garis and Nina M. Davies

The Egyptologists Nina M. Davies (6 January 1881 – 21 April 1965) and Norman de Garis Davies (1865–5 November 1941) were a married couple of illustrators and copyists who worked in the early and mid-twentieth century drawing and recording paintings in Egypt. Their work was often published together, as N. de Garis Davies, and so it is usually difficult to determine who drew which illustration.

== Early life and adulthood ==
=== Nina ===
Nina M. Davies was born Anna Macpherson Cummings in Salonika, Greece, the eldest of three daughters of Cecil J. Cummings, but returned to Scotland with the death of her father in 1894. Her parents were of English and Scottish ancestry. Nina was schooled in England and showed considerable promise as an artist in her youth, with her family moving to London for her training. She was on a vacation in Alexandria, Egypt in 1906 when she met Norman de Garis Davies. They married in Hampstead, London on 8 October 1907 and settled near the Theban Necropolis and began documenting tomb paintings. Nina spent half of her time making drawings for the Metropolitan Museum and spent an equal amount of time replicating the tomb paintings for Alan Gardiner, which became part of collections at other museums. Nina developed a skill of quickly, accurately, and conscientiously capturing the images, creating a large number of facsimiles.

=== Norman ===
Norman de Garis Davies studied theology at Glasgow University, gaining a M.A. and B.D., and studied at Marburg University as a postgraduate. He was a Minister in the Congregational church at Ashton-under-Lyne when he first visited Egypt in 1897. He worked there for Flinders Petrie at Dendera. He became head of the Egypt Exploration Fund's Archaeological Survey. From about 1898 to 1907, Norman documented tombs in Egypt, such as Tell el-Amarna. He became an expert at interpreting the Egyptian hieroglyphics within the context of the painting.

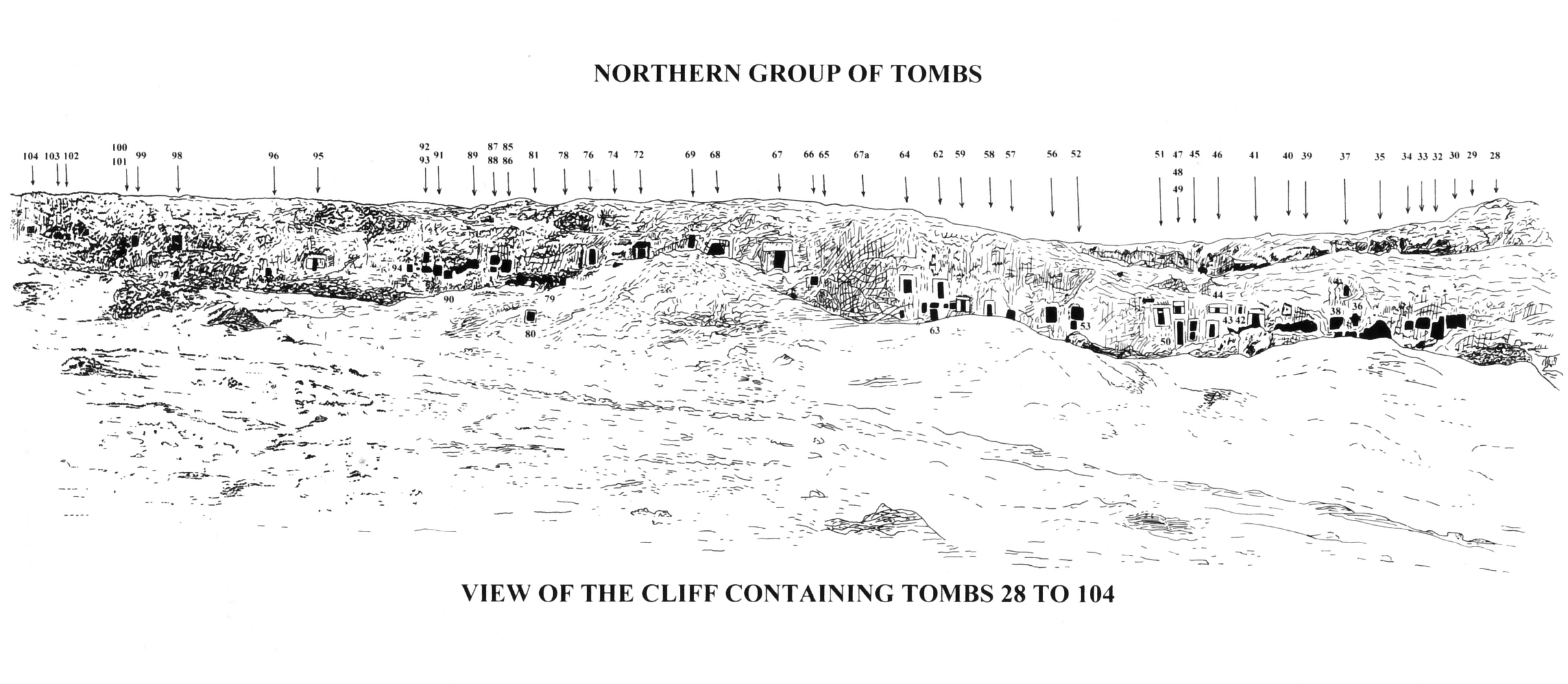
Norman de Garis Davies, Northern group of tombs, view of a cliff containing tomb numbers 28 to 104, Deir el-Gabrawi, 1902

== Egyptologists ==
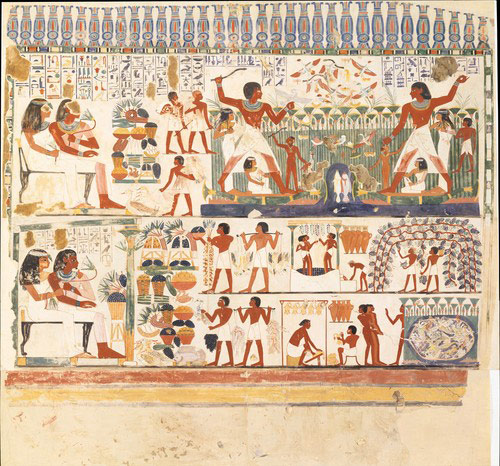
Norman de Garis Davies, Nakht and Family Fishing and Fowling, Tomb of Nakht, Graphic Expedition, Metropolitan Museum of Art, 1915

In 1907 an Egyptian Expedition was developed to make facsimiles of Egyptian Wall Paintings for the Metropolitan Museum of Art in New York. Norman, Nina, and other artists took tracings of the tombs, using a technique that allowed for nearly exact brushstroke and color replication. In most cases, the copies reflected the actual scene, including any damage that may have been sustained over time or as the result of vandalism. In some cases, the drawings were rendered to look like they would have when created several thousand years ago. The Graphic Section effort was led by Norman, who had a dual-role interpreting the hieroglyphs and copying the images. The artists signed their work. Nina's signature was Na.deGD and Norman signed No.deGD, but there were also signatures of NdeGD where it was not clear if the work was performed by Nina or Norman.

The tombs were located on the Nile's west bank of western Thebes. The museum was particularly interested in the tombs of officials, Valley of the Kings and Valley of the Queens royal tombs, and Deir el-Medina artists' tombs. These sites are, according to the Metropolitan Museum, "the richest source of ancient Egyptian paintings preserved anywhere in Egypt.

The tomb images vary across dynasties and reigns, providing insight into daily life, flora and fauna changes, and ceremonial and burial customs in the distinct periods. Artistic techniques also varied across time. By 1941, about 350 facsimiles were painted and are now key displays in the Met's Egyptian department.

They worked for the Egypt Exploration Society, London and Oriental Institute, Chicago by documenting other Egyptian sites, like Abydos and Amarna. In 1939, they returned to England. Norman died two years later. Nina died in 1965.

== Collections ==
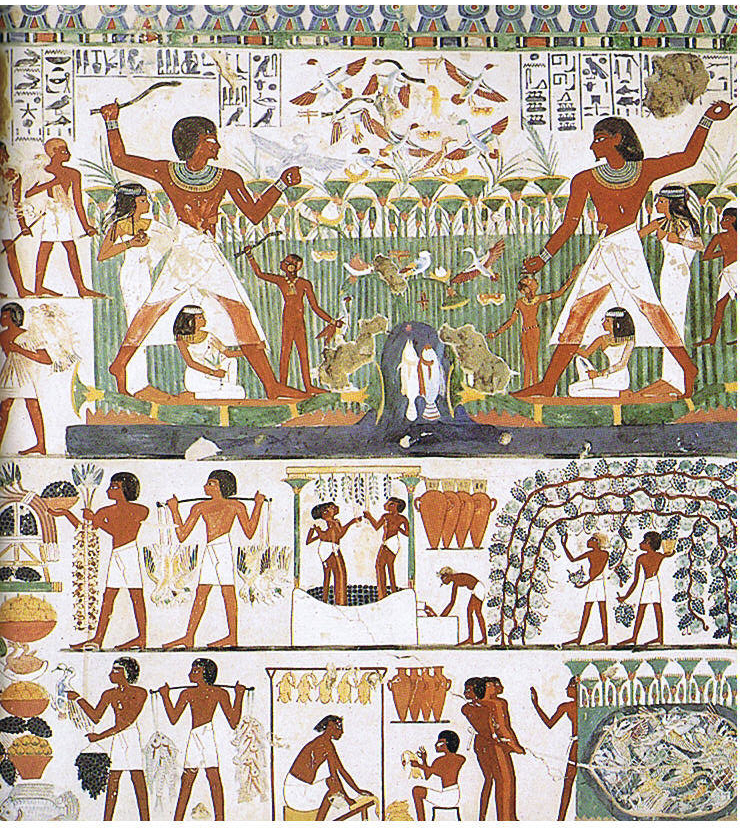
Norman and Nina de Garis Davis, Tomb of Nakht, copy of a 15th-century BC Picture, January 1907

- Metropolitan Museum of Art has 413 total de Garis Davies items in its collection. Of those, 157 items painted by Nina, 15 with both of their names, and 59 by Norman, including:
  - Nina de Garis Davies, Netting Birds, Tomb of Khnumhotep, Egypt, Middle Kingdom, Dynasty 12, Reign of Amenemhat II, ca. 1897–1878 B.C., Tempera on Pape, MMA graphic expedition 1931
  - Nina de Garis Davies, Sculptors at Work, Tomb of Rekhmire (TT 100), Egypt, New Kingdom, Dynasty 18, Reign of Thutmose III–early Amenhotep II, ca. 1479–1425 B.C., Tempera on Paper
  - Norman de Garis Davies, Leaders of a Group of Asiatics, Egypt, Middle Kingdom, Dynasty 12, Reign of Senwosret II, ca. 1887–1878 B.C., MMA graphic expedition 1931, Tempera on paper
- British Museum had 22 of Nina de Garis Davies' paintings in 1936 given to the museum by Alan Gardiner, including:
  - Nina de Garis Davies, Fig gatherers with baboons in the trees from the tomb of Khnumhotep II, Ancient Egypt & Sudan
  - Nina de Garis Davies, Goldsmiths and Joiners, Ancient Egypt & Sudan

== Publications ==
Some of the publications are:

- Nina Macpherson Davies; Norman de Garis Davies; Alan Henderson Gardiner (1915). The Theban Tombs Series. Edited by Norman de Garis Davies and Alan H. Gardiner. The Egypt Exploration Fund.
- Martin Hardie; Nina de Garis Davies (1923). Facsimiles of Theban Wall-paintings by Nina de Garis Davies lent by Alan H. Gardiner. Victoria and Albert Museum.
- Norman de Garis Davies (1901). The Rock Tombs of Sheikh Saïd. The Egypt Exploration Fund.
- Norman de Garis Davies; Walter Ewing Crum; George Albert Boulenger (1902). The Rock Tombs of Deir El Gebrâwi: Tomb of the Aba and smaller tombs of the southern group. The Egypt Exploration Fund.
- Norman de Garis Davies; Seymour de Ricci (1906). The Rock Tombs of El-Amarna: The tomb of Meryra. The Egypt Exploration Fund.
- Norman de Garis Davies; Seymour de Ricci (1908). The Rock Tombs of El Amarna: Smaller tombs and boundary stelae.
- Norman de Garis Davies; Seymour de Ricci (1908). The Rock Tombs of El-Amarna: The tomb of Tutu. The Egypt Exploration Fund.
- Norman de Garis Davies (1911). Graphic Work of the Egyptian Expedition. The Metropolitan Museum of Art.
- Norman de Garis Davies (1911). The Rock-cut Tombs of Sheikh Abd El Qurneh, at Thebes. The Metropolitan Museum of Art.
- Norman de Garis Davies (1913). Five Theban Tombs: being those of Mentuherkhepeshef, User, Daga, Nehemawäy and Tati. London: K. Paul, Trench, Trübner.
- Norman de Garis Davies (1917). The tomb of Nakht at Thebes. New York: The Metropolitan Museum of Art.
- Norman de Garis Davies (1933). The tomb of Nefer-hotep at Thebes. Metropolitan Museum of Art.
- Norman de Garis Davies (1920). An Alabaster Sistrum Dedicated by King Teta. The Egypt Exploration Society.
- Norman de Garis Davies; Alan Henderson Gardiner (1920). The Tomb of Antefoker, Visier of Sesostris I, and of His Wife, Senet. Allen & Unwin, under the auspices of the Egypt Exploration Society.
- Norman de Garis Davies (1918). The Egyptian Expedition, 1916–17. The Metropolitan Museum of Art.
- Ambrose Lansing; Norman de Garis Davies; Hugh Gerard Evelyn-White (1920). The Egyptian Expedition, 1916–1919. Metropolitan Museum of Art.
- Albert Frisch; Emery Walker; Nina De Garis Davies; Norman de Garis Davies (1925). Egyptian Wall Paintings from Copies by Norman de Garis Davies, Nina de Garis Davies and H.R. Hopgood. The Metropolitan Museum of Art.

== Notes and references ==
=== Further reading ===
- "Theban tomb tracings made by Norman and Nina De Garis Davies". Griffith Institute.
