= Abnub =

Abnub ⲡⲛⲟⲩⲃ
- Location in Egypt
- Coordinates: 27°16′N 31°09′E
- Country: Egypt
- Governorate: Asyut Governorate

Area
  - Total: 16.0 km^{2} (6.2 sq mi)
- Elevation: 57 m (187 ft)

Population (2023)
  - Total: 118,843
  - Density: 7,430/km^{2} (19,200/sq mi)
- Demonym(s): Abnubi (Male, Arabic: أبنوبي) Abnubiyah (Female, Arabic: أبنوبية)
- Time zone: UTC+2 (EET)
  - Summer (DST): UTC+3 (EEST)

Abnub (Arabic: أبنوب, from Coptic: *ⲡⲛⲟⲩⲃ) is a city in Egypt. It is located on the east bank of the Nile, in the Asyut Governorate, several kilometres northwest of Asyut. As of the 2023 census, the population was 118,843. The city's name ultimately comes from Ancient Egyptian: pr-nbw, lit. 'treasury'.

== Notable people ==
Abnub is the birthplace of Pope Shenouda III of Alexandria, the Pope of the Coptic Orthodox Church from 1971 to 2012.

A church in Abnub bears the name of Phoibammon of Preht, a 4th century martyr.
