= Sidfa =

Sidfa صدفا
- Town
- Location in Egypt
- Coordinates: 26°57′55″N 31°22′51″E
- Country: Egypt
- Governorate: Asyut

Area
  - Total: 33.08 sq mi (85.67 km^{2})

Population (2021)
  - Total: 200,977
  - Density: 6,076/sq mi (2,346/km^{2})
- Time zone: UTC+2 (EET)
  - Summer (DST): UTC+3 (EEST)

O6 O34 R4 X1 Q3 X1 O49
ḥt sḥtp
in hieroglyphs
Era: Ptolemaic dynasty
(305–30 BC)

Sidfa (Arabic: صدفا, from Ancient Egyptian: ḥw.t-sḥtp.t) is a town in Egypt. It is located near the city of Abnub in the Asyut Governorate. It was known in antiquity by the Greeks as Hisopis.

== See also ==
- List of cities and towns in Egypt
