= Asyut Governorate =

Governorate of Egypt

- Governorate
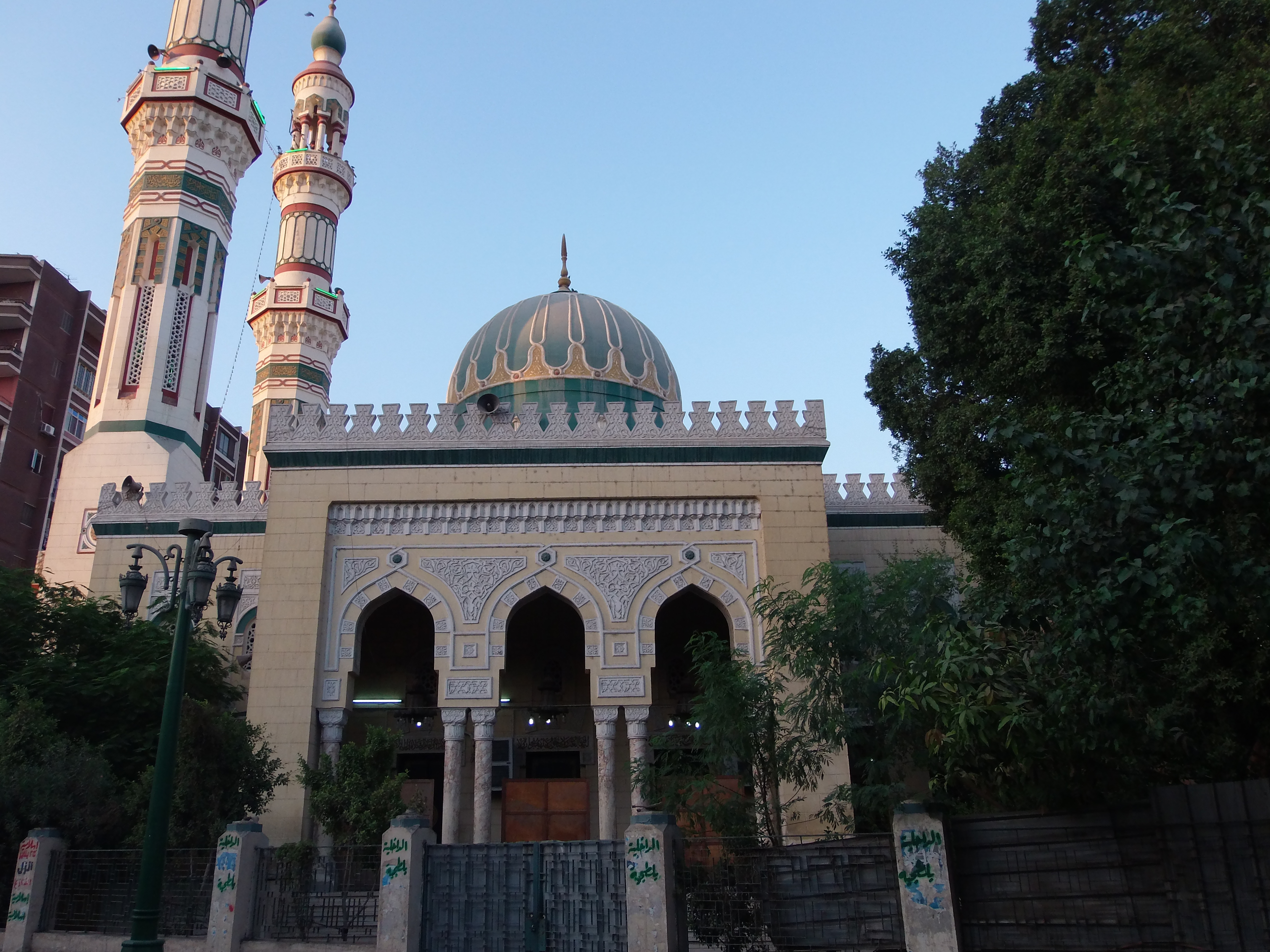
- Nasser mosque

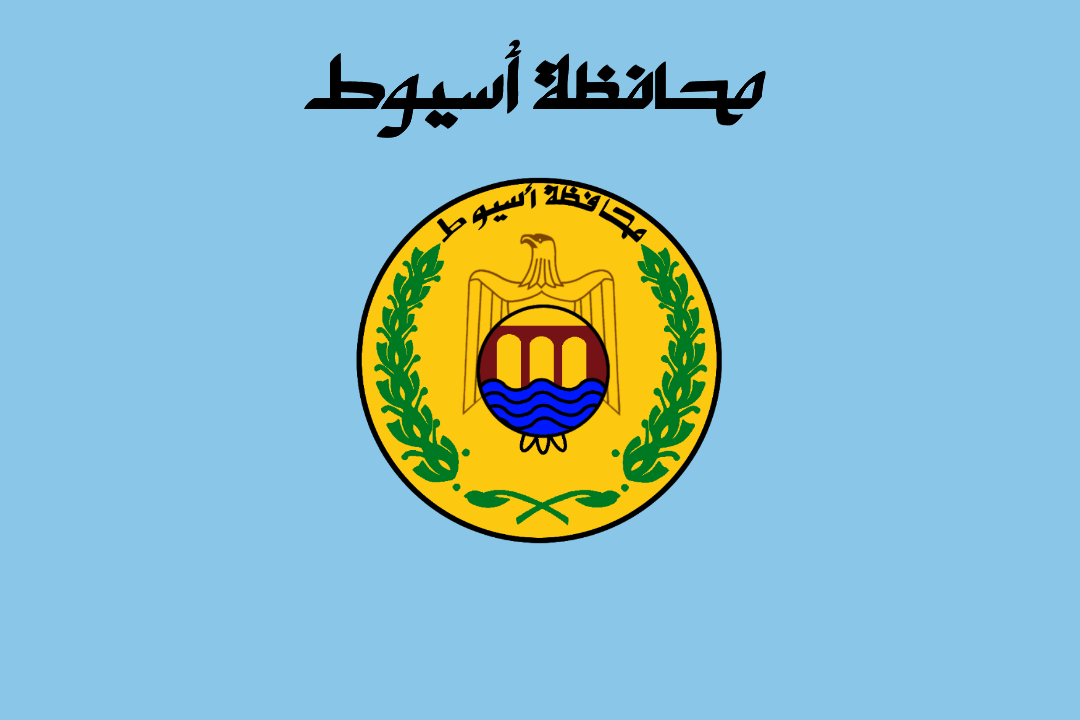
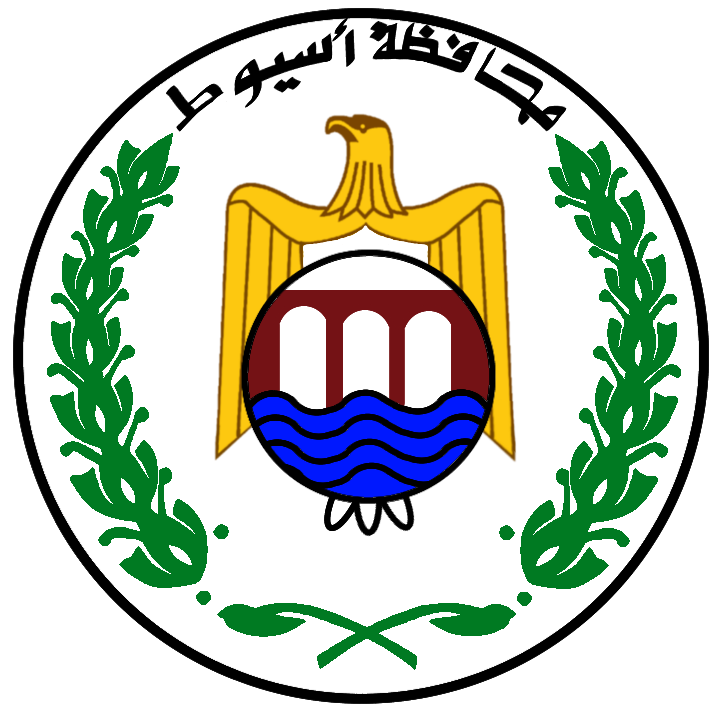
- Flag

- Asyut Governorate on the map of Egypt
- Coordinates: 27.252°N 31.09°E
- Country: Egypt
- Seat: Asyut (capital)

Government
  - Governor: Hisham Ahmed Sharaf

Area
  - Total: 25,926 km^{2} (10,010 sq mi)

Population (January 2023)
  - Total: 5,169,423
  - Density: 199.39/km^{2} (516.42/sq mi)

GDP
  - Total: EGP 126 billion (US$ 8.0 billion)
- Time zone: UTC+2 (EGY)
  - Summer (DST): UTC+3 (EEST)
- HDI (2023): 0.705 high · 22nd

Asyūṭ (Arabic: محافظة أسيوط) is one of the 27 governorates of Egypt. It stretches across a section of the Nile River. The capital of the governorate is the city of Asyut.

== Etymology ==
The name of Asyut is derived from early Egyptian Zawty (Z3JW.TJ), late Egyptian Səyáwt, into Coptic Syowt. An A was added to the beginning of the name Syowt to become Asyut.

== Overview ==
The rate of poverty in Asyut is more than 60%. Recently, some social safety networks have been provided, in the form of financial assistance and job opportunities. The funding has been coordinated by Egypt's Ministry of Finance, with assistance from international organizations.

== Municipal divisions ==
The governorate is divided into municipal divisions, with a total estimated population of 5,231,820 as of April 2025. In Asyut Governorate, there is 1 new city, three aqsam and eleven marakiz. Sometimes a markaz and a qism share a name.

Municipal Divisions
Anglicized name	Native name	Arabic transliteration	Population (January 2023 Est.)	Type
Abnub	مركز أبنوب	Abnūb	469,686	Markaz
Abu Tig	قسم ابو تيج	Abū Tīj	110,510	Kism (fully urban)
Abu Tig	مركز أبو تيج	Abū Tīj	258,283	Markaz
El Badari	مركز البدارى	Al-Badārī	307,072	Markaz
El Fateh	مركز الفتح	Al-Fatḥ	359,263	Markaz
El Ghanayem	مركز الغنايم	Al-Ghanāyim	154,088	Markaz
El Qusiya	مركز القوصية	Al-Qūṣiyah	526,837	Markaz
Asyut	مركز أسيوط	Asyūṭ	578,782	Markaz
Asyut 1	قسم أول أسيوط	Asyūṭ 1	299,892	Kism (fully urban)
Asyut 2	قسم ثان أسيوط	Asyūṭ 2	254,312	Kism (fully urban)
Dairut	مركز ديروط	Dayrūṭ	674,516	Markaz
New Asyut	مدينة اسيوط الجديدة	Madīnat Asyūṭ al-Jadīdah	9,674	New City
Manfalut	مركز منفلوط	Manfalūṭ	595,750	Markaz
Sahel Selim	مركز ساحل سليم	Sāḥīl Salim	205,847	Markaz
Sidfa	مركز صدفا	Ṣidfa	207,303	Markaz

== Population ==
According to 2024 estimates, the majority of residents in the governorate live in rural areas, with an urbanization rate of only 26.5%. Out of an estimated 5,169,423 people residing in the governorate, 3,799,525 live in rural areas, as opposed to only 1,369,898 in urban areas.

== Demographics ==
Asyut has a population of over 4 million people, with a significant Coptic presence. Muslims and Christians have lived together in Asyut and at times there have been clashes. In July 2013, a large number of Christians took to the streets to protest Muslim extremism in Asyut.

== Cities ==
- Abnub
- Abu Tig
- Asyut
- Dairut
- El Badari
- El Ghanayem
- Manfalut
- El Quseyya
- Sahel Selim
- Sanabo
- Sodfa
- New Nasser City

== Industrial zones ==
According to the Governing Authority for Investment and Free Zones (GAFI), the following industrial zones are located in Asyut:

Zone name
Bidary Industrial Zone
Dashlot Dariot Industrial Zone
El Awamer Abanoub Industrial Zone
El Safaa Industrial Zone
El Zarrabi Wadi Serga Mountain Industrial Zone
Sahel Selem Industrial Zone

== Projects and programs ==
In 2016, Switzerland committed to funding a solid waste management program in Asyut, a project with the Egyptian Ministry of Environment that will conclude in 2021. The National Solid Waste Management Programme (NSWMP) involves the construction of infrastructure for new as well as the expansion and improvement of existing waste treatment, landfill, and recycling facilities.

== Important sites ==
Ancient quarries are an important feature of Asyut. There are about 500 rock-cut tombs and limestone quarries all around Asyut. The governorate of Asyut includes the Ancient Egyptian tombs of Meir, and the town of Durunka, which is a pilgrimage site for many Copts who come to visit a monastery dedicated to the Virgin Mary.

- Deir el-Gabrawi
- Durunka
- Meir

== Notable people ==
- Ahmed Lutfi el-Sayed, Egyptian nationalist.
- al-Suyuti, a Sunni Muslim theologian who died in 1505.
- Akhnoukh Fanous, political activist
- Coluthus, 5th century Greek poet.
- Ester Fanous, female activist
- Farghali Abdel Hafiz
- Gamal Abdel Nasser, Second President of Egypt
- Hafez Ibrahim, poet born in Dairut, Asyut
- Ismail al-Qabbani
- Louis Gris
- Melitius of Lycopolis, founder of the Melitians.
- Mustafa Lutfi al-Manfaluti
- Mohamed Ahmed Farghali Pasha
- Mohamed Mustagab
- Pope Shenouda III of Alexandria, Pope of the Coptic Orthodox Church
- Samir Ghanem, a comedian, singer, and entertainer.
