= Amenemhat (nomarch, 16th nome) =

Egyptian nomarch

Amenemhat / Ameny
- Nomarch of the 16th nome of Upper Egypt
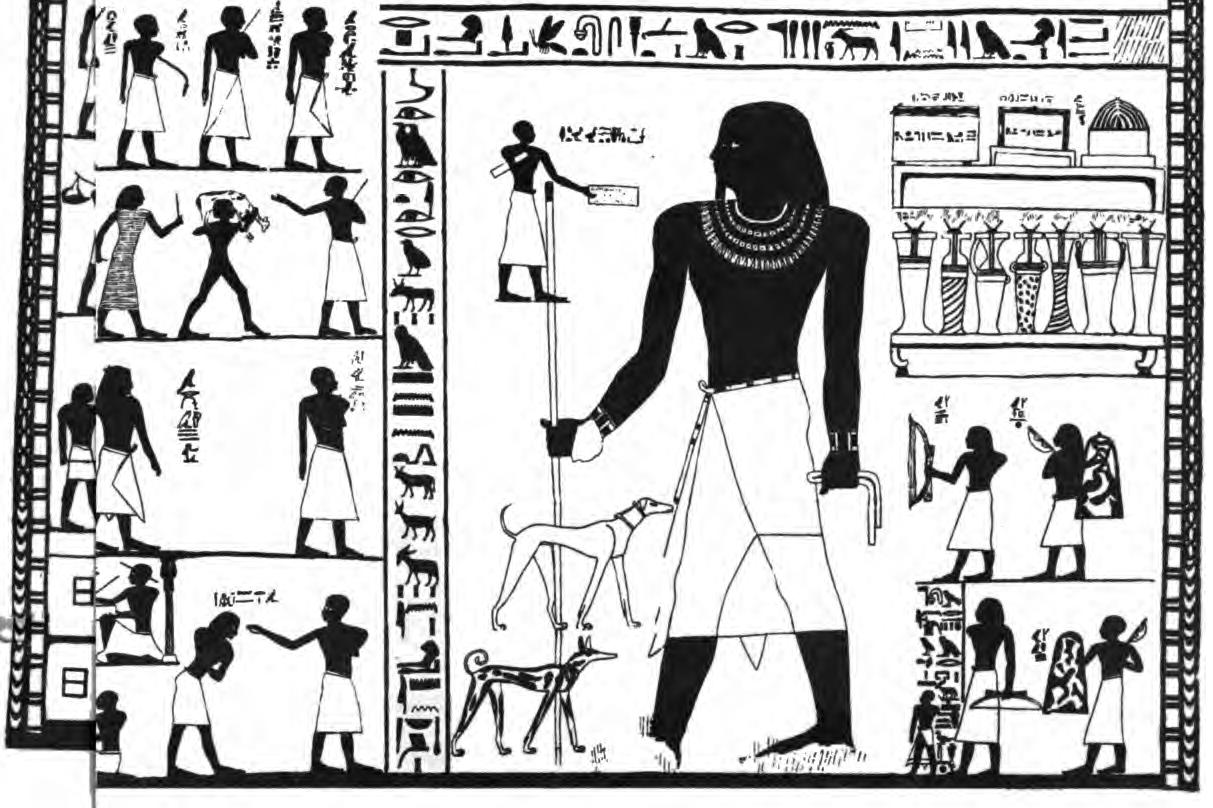
- Amenemhat (middle) receives offerings. Drawing of a decoration from his tomb
Egyptian name
i mn n m HAt t Z1Amenemhati mn n i iAmeny
- Predecessor: Nakht
- Successor: Netjernakht
- Dynasty: 12th Dynasty
- Pharaoh: Senusret I
- Burial: Beni Hasan tomb 2 (BH2)
- Spouse: Hetepet (lady of the house)
- Mother: Henu (noblewoman)
- Children: Khnumhotep

Amenemhat, often reported with his short form Ameny (Jmnjj), was an ancient Egyptian "Overlord of the Oryx nome" (the 16th nome of Upper Egypt) and chief priest during the reign of pharaoh Senusret I of the 12th Dynasty (20th century BCE).

== Biography ==
=== Family ===
Amehemhat's mother was a noblewoman called Henu, whilst his father's name is unknown. Amenemhat was married to Hetepet, a "mistress of the house" and daughter of a governor, and the couple had a son called Khnumhotep. However, any relationship between Amenemhat and the ruling family of governors founded earlier by Khnumhotep I is unknown, and it was proposed that he could rather have been a member of the previous family of local governors.

=== Governorship ===
Amenemhat administered his governorate from the city of Men'at Khufu from Year 18 to at least Year 43 of Senusret I.

Amenemhat accompanied the pharaoh in a military expedition to Kush; though the date is unknown, it's likely the same, known expedition of Year 18 of Senusret I. In another expedition Amenemhat escorted the "king's son Ameny" – very likely the future pharaoh Amenemhat II – with 400 men to collect gold from an unknown Nubian location. Amenemhat also was sent to Coptos along with the vizier Senusret in order to bring other gold. These expeditions suggest that Amenemhat was a very important official who usually accompanied high dignitaries and even members of the royal family.

Curiously, Amenemhat dated his monuments from his installation in a way usually associated to the kings: the highest known date, Senusret I regnal Year 43, Month 2 of Akhet, Day 15 corresponds to Amenemhat's Year 25. However, there is no proof that people living under his governorship effectively used Amenemhat's personal datation.
Amenemhat died some times after this date. His relationships with his probable successor Netjernakht are not known. He was also the last governor of Men'at Khufu who brought the title of "Overlord of the Nome". In addition to this office, Amenemhat also held a massive amount of civil, military and religious titles, such as iry-pat, haty-a, "confidential friend of the King", "royal acquaintance", "mayor of Nekheb", "overseer of the priests of Khnum-lord-of-Herwer", "lector priest" and many others.

== Tomb BH2 ==
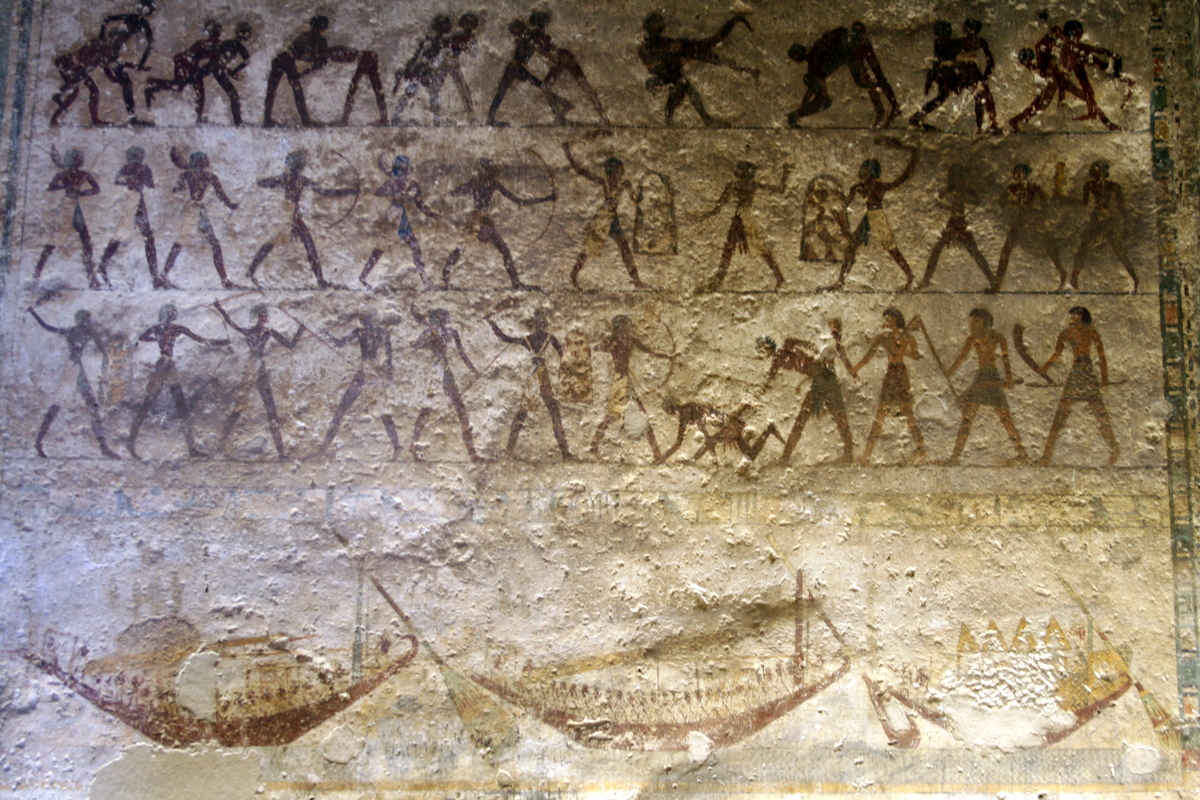
Painting from the tomb: wrestling scenes and the "Journey to Abydos"

Amenemhat/Ameny was likely buried in his large, lively decorated tomb (no. 2) within the necropolis of Beni Hasan. The tomb's chapel consisted in a large room with four columns, placed after a courtyard and a portico which was provided of two other columns. The chapel's main room is richly painted with scenes of wrestling and of siege of a fortress, two themes commonly found within Beni Hasan tombs. Other scenes in Amenemhat's tomb consists in the so-called, ritual "Journey to Abydos", as well as many artisans and farmers at work and a hunting in the desert. On the south wall, Amenemhet himself and his wife Hetepet are depicted with a large amount of offerings. The room's ceiling was divided into three decorated naves. A small cult niche was made in the east side of the main room, probably meant to host a statue group of the tomb owner, traces of which have been found.

The tomb also bore a graffito which was a possible attestation of Wepwawetemsaf, a poorly known pharaoh dated to the later Second Intermediate Period of Egypt. This graffito has been considered a proof that Wepwawetemsaf, who probably had his seat of power in Abydos, could have extended his authority about 250 km north, up to Beni Hasan. The graffito has been tentatively read by Jürgen von Beckerath as "Sekhemreneferkhau" (Wepwawetemsaf's throne name) but this remains uncertain as the original is now lost.
