= Nefrusy =

Nefrusy was an ancient Egyptian city which location is north of modern day cities of El Ashmunein and El Quseyya. It is known for being the site of Battle of Nefrusy between the forces of Kamose and Hyksos forces, which saw the first attested use of chariots in the history of Military of ancient Egypt.

== History ==
In the Old Kingdom, Nefrusy is first attested in a tomb at Hebenu where Hathor, mistress of Nefrusy is mentioned.

In the Middle Kingdom, the place is mentioned several times in the tombs of Beni Hasan where Hathor, lady of Nefrusy is also mentioned. Hetepet, consort of the nomarch Amenemhet was a priestess of Hathor of Nefrusy. Under Teti son of Pepi, Nefrusy is described in the victory stela of Kamose as a 'nest of Asiatics'. Kamose destroyed Nefrusy on his campaign against the Hyksos.

In the New Kingdom, other mayors residing there were Iuno, Mahu, Iamunefer, Pahahauti are known by name.

== Hieroglyphic Descriptor ==
nfr w s niwt nfrws(j) in hieroglyphs Era: Middle Kingdom (2055–1650 BC)	nfr f r V1 s y niwt nfrwsj in hieroglyphs Era: New Kingdom (1550–1069 BC)	nfr w z niwt nfrws(j) in hieroglyphs Era: 3rd Intermediate Period (1069–664 BC)	nfr f r z t niwt nfr(w)s(t) in hieroglyphs Era: Late Period (664–332 BC)

== Modern Location ==
Its location has been suggested by Gaston Maspero to be at modern village of Etlidem 27 km (17 miles) south of Minya, and by Georges Daressy to be at modern village of Balansourah on the canal of Bahr Yussef 12 km (7.5 miles) west of Abu Qirqas.

== See also ==
- List of ancient Egyptian towns and cities

== Bibliography ==
- Wilkinson, Toby. The Rise and Fall of Ancient Egypt. Random House, New York, 2010. ISBN 978-0-679-60429-7
- Ryholt, Kim SB. The Political Situation in Egypt during the Second Intermediate Period. Carsten Niebuhr Institute Publications, Copenhagen, 1997. ISBN 87-7289-421-0
