= Khety (BH17) =

Egyptian local governor

- Nomarch of the 16th nome of Upper Egypt
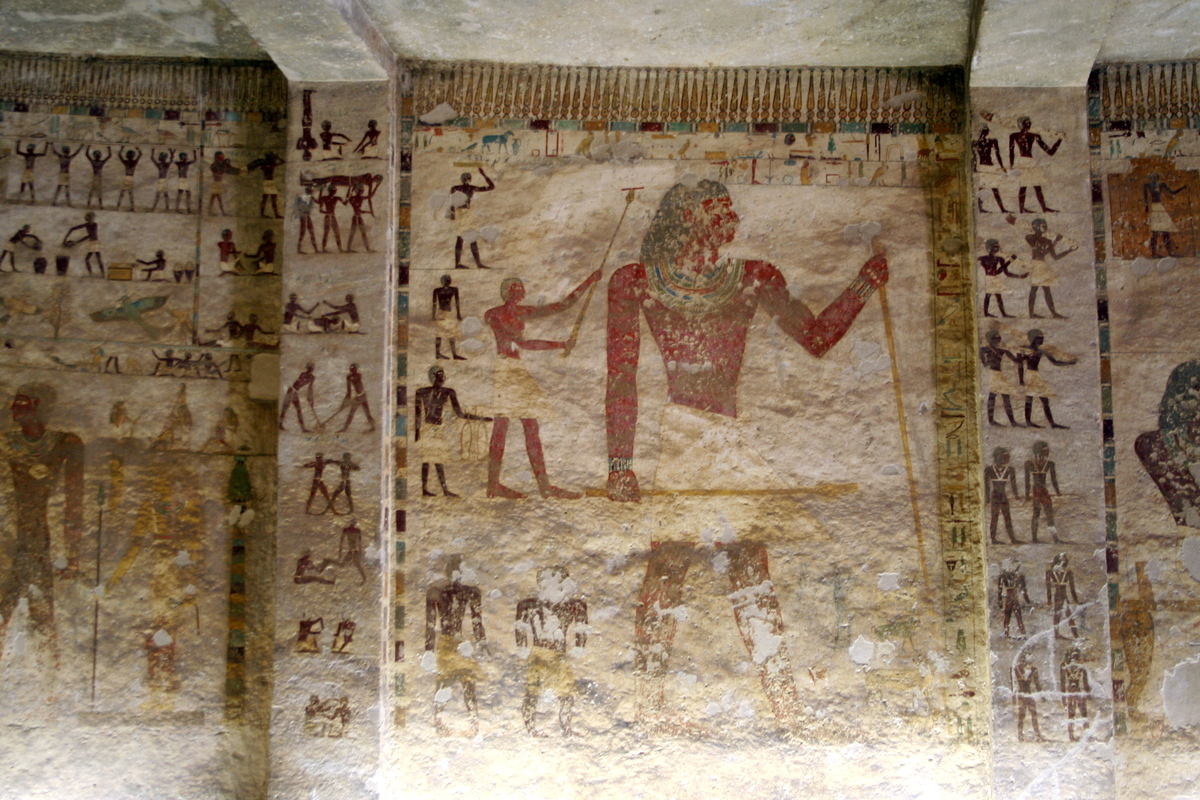
- Khety as depicted in his tomb
- Dynasty: 11th Dynasty to 12th Dynasty
- Pharaoh: Mentuhotep II to Amenemhat I
- Burial: Beni Hasan tomb 17 (BH17)
- Spouse: Khnumhotep
- Father: Baqet III?
- Mother: Unknown
- Children: Khety?

Khety was an ancient Egyptian local governor of the Oryx nome in Middle Egypt in the Eleventh Dynasty or Twelfth Dynasty.

== Early life ==
It is believed he was the son of Baqet III and born to Khnumhotep.

Not much is known about his family. His father was a person called Baqet, his wife was called Khnumhotep and there is one son attested with the name Khety. Naguib Kanawati wonders whether Khety was the son of Baqet III. The latter's tomb and those of Khety share the same plan and are close to each other.

== Nomarch ==
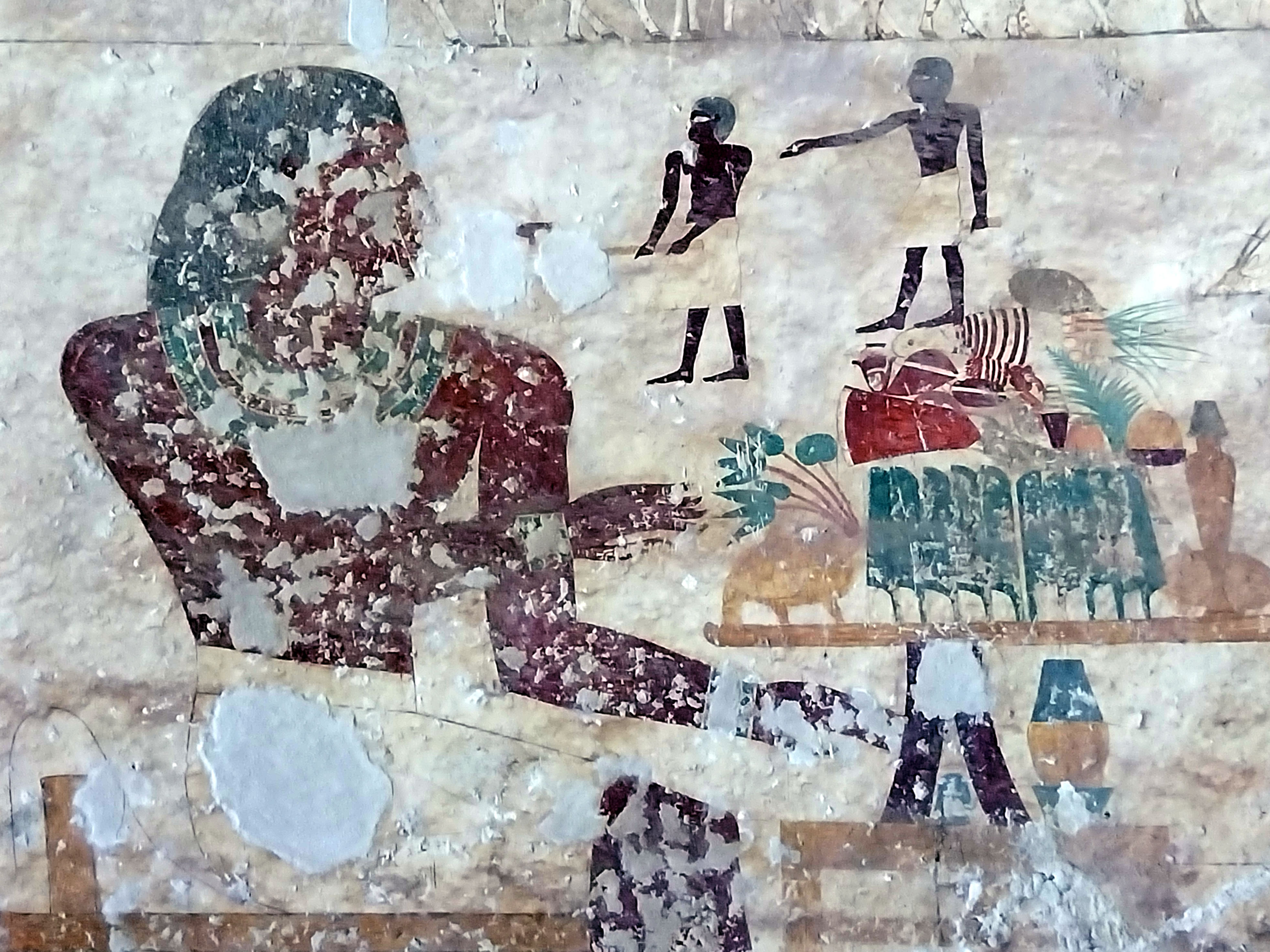
Khety in front of offering table

In the decoration of his tomb chapel appear several inscriptions providing the name and titles of Khety. He was great overlord of the entire Oryx nome. This is the main title of the local governors of the Oryx nome. Other titles include count (Haty-a), royal sealer, sole friend, king's acquaintance, who is in the chamber, who belongs to Nekhen and overlord of Nekheb, but also overseer of troops at all secret places.

He may have been preceded by Baqet III and succeeded by Khnumhotep I.

== Burial ==
At Beni Hasan, he was buried in a decorated tomb chapel (BH 17). His tomb chapel is cut into the rock and consists of one room with six columns, also cut into the rocks. The tomb decoration is painted and shows Khety hunting in the marshes, workmen and farmers, wrestlers, but also a siege of a fortress.

== Theories ==
His dating is uncertain; perhaps he lived at the beginning of the Twelfth Dynasty under king Senusret I.
