= Khnumhotep IV =

Nomarch

- Nomarch of the 16th nome of Upper Egypt
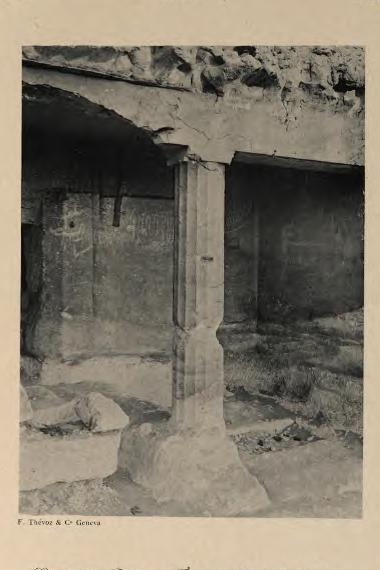
- Entrance of Khnumhotep IV's tomb at Beni Hasan
- Predecessor: Khnumhotep II
- Dynasty: 12th Dynasty
- Burial: Beni Hasan tomb 4 (BH4)
- Father: Khnumhotep II
- Mother: Tjat

Khnumhotep IV was an ancient Egyptian local governor buried at Beni Hasan. He was the son of Khnumhotep II and his lesser wife Tjat. He was the half-brother of Khnumhotep III, who made a career at the royal court.

Khnumhotep IV is depicted in the tomb of his father Khnumhotep II as heir and successor. He is also known from his own tomb at Beni Hasan. His tomb is unfinished and bears just on the outside a short text with his titles Iry-pat and Haty-a (member of the elite and mayor). He does not bear the classical title of a Great Chief.

Under king Senusret III, the power of local governors was reduced. They could no longer afford larger tombs. Khnumhotep IV is the last known governor buried at Beni Hasan. His small burial clearly shows the decline in power of the local governors.

== Literature ==
Percy Newberry, Beni Hasan. (1893) Part I1. London, England: Kegan Paul, Trench, Tubner & Co., Ltd., p.9, plates XXXIX-LX Available online.
