= Ramushenti =

Egyptian local governor

- Nomarch of the 16th nome of Upper Egypt
Egyptian name
r Z1 mw V7 n t i
- Successor: Baqet III?
- Dynasty: 11th Dynasty?
- Pharaoh: Mentuhotep II?
- Burial: Beni Hasan tomb 27 (BH27)
- Children: Baqet III?

Ramushenti was an ancient Egyptian local governor of the Oryx nome in Middle Egypt. He is only known from his decorated tomb chapel (BH 27) at Beni Hasan. In the decoration of his tomb chapel appear several inscriptions providing the name and titles of Ramushenti. He was great overlord of the Oryx nome. This is the main title of the local governors. Other titles include count (Haty-a), royal sealer, sole friend, king's acquaintance, who is in the chamber, who belongs to Nekhen and overlord of Nekheb. Not much is known about his family. However, the parents of the local governor Baqet III (buried in BH 15) are a person called Ramushenti and a woman called Heteperau. The two Ramushentis might be the same person. According to this, Ramushenti was the father of Baqet III who was most likely his successor.

The precise dating of Ramushenti is uncertain, but he most likely belongs to the 11th Dynasty.

The decoration of his tomb chapel is not well preserved and not yet fully published. The paintings were in modern times badly restored causing much damage to them.
