= Oryx nome =

Administrative division of ancient Egypt

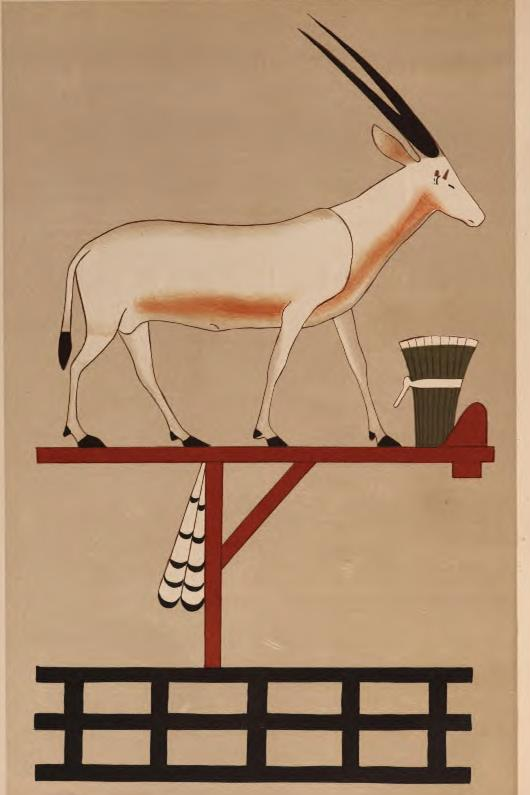
The symbol of the Oryx nome, from the tomb of Khnumhotep II at Beni Hasan

The Oryx nome (Ancient Egyptian: 𓉇 Ma-hedj) was one of the 42 nomoi (administrative divisions, Egyptian: sepat) in ancient Egypt. The Oryx nome was the 16th nome of Upper Egypt, and was named after the scimitar oryx (a type of antelope). It was located, approximately, in the territories surrounding the modern city of Minya in Middle Egypt.

== History ==
The nome is mentioned on vessels found in the pyramid complex of king Djoser, who ruled at the beginning of the Old Kingdom. Near Zawyet el-Maiyitin were buried the local governors of the late Old Kingdom.
Most of the history of this nome in the Middle Kingdom comes from the rock-cut tombs of its nomarchs, which were buried at Beni Hasan. Like many other nomes, the Oryx nome rose to prominence during the First Intermediate Period, an epoch that witnessed the decline of royal power and the increase of the local governors' influence. When, during the end of this period, the 11th Dynasty of Theban rulers were close to defeating the rival 10th Dynasty of Herakleopolis, the nomarch of the Oryx nome Baqet III switched from neutrality to an allegiance to the Thebans. Subsequent nomarchs managed to gather a considerable amount of wealth between the late 11th to middle 12th Dynasty, as shown by their large and finely decorated tombs at Beni Hasan; some of these governors, like Khnumhotep II, also held the national-level office of Overseer of the Eastern Desert.
During the highly centralized reign of pharaoh Senusret III, the power of the nomarchs of the Oryx nome may have declined dramatically, as no burials of governors were found after his reign. In the Second Intermediate Period this nome became part of the 15th Upper Egyptian nome and disappeared as its own administrative unit.

== Cities and deities ==
The Oryx nome governed many important cities but for most of these the exact locations are still uncertain: Akoris (modern Tihna el-Gebel), Men'at Khufu (possibly Minya), Hebenu (possibly Kom el-Ahmar), Nefrusy (location unknown) and Herwer (possibly Hur).
The capital of the Oryx nome is far to being securely determined. It may have been Herwer, though the nomarchs' necropolis is at Beni Hasan which was likely close to Men'at Khufu, and is known that some governors such as Khnumhotep I were both nomarch and governor of Men'at Khufu.

According to the inscriptions on the White Chapel of Senusret I, the local god of the Oryx nome was Horus of Hebenu. Other important deities were Hathor at Nefrusy and the couple Khnum-Heqet at Herwer.

== Nomarchs of the Oryx nome ==
The following is a genealogy of the nomarchs of the Oryx nome during the late 11th and 12th Dynasty (the limit between the two dynasties passes approximately along the third and fourth generations). The nomarchs of the Oryx nome are underlined and placed roughly in chronological order from top to bottom.

Family tree of Oryx nome Nomarchs

Baqet I♂	Djehutyqai♀
Baqet II♂
Ramushenti♂	Heteperau♀
Baqet III♂	Khnumhotep♀	Baqet♀	Unknown man
Twelfth Dynasty
Khety (Note: Khety's tenure begin during the 11th Dynasty and extended into the 12th)♂
Heryib♀	Herit♀	Khnumhotep I♂	Zatipy♀	Unknown woman
Henu♀	Unknown man
Arythotep♀	Unknown man	Nakht♂	Baqet♀	Neheri♂
Amenemhat♂	Hetepet♀	Unknown nomarch of Hardai
Netjernakht (Note: It is known that Netjernakht was related to Khnumhotep I and his family but how exactly he was related is unknown.)♂	Herib♀
Khnumhotep♂	Tjat♀	Khnumhotep II♂	Khety♀
Khnumhotep IV♂	Neheri♂	Unknown man	Khnumhotep III♂	Nakht♂
