= Zatipy =

Ancient Egyptian princess

Zatipy (daughter of Ipy; fl. c. 2000 BC) was an ancient Egyptian woman who lived at the beginning of the 12th Dynasty under king Amenemhat I. She was the wife of Khnumhotep I who was local governor in the Oryx nome. Zatipy is depicted in the tomb of her husband at Beni Hasan. There she is shown behind him, both watching activities of peasants in the marshes. Behind her depiction, her name and titles are written. She was member of the elite (iryt-pat), wife of the ruler and lady of the house. She is also called mistress of all women. The relative high number of titles is remarkable. Especially the title member of the elite is rare for women and only better attested for women with royal connections. It was therefore proposed that Zatipy came from a royal or highly important family. If she was a princess, king Amenemhat I might have tried with this marriage to keep close ties to an important local family.
