= Nakht (nomarch) =

Ancient Egyptian nomarch

- Nomarch of the 16th nome of Upper Egypt
- Predecessor: Khnumhotep I
- Dynasty: 12th Dynasty
- Father: Khnumhotep I

Nakht (or Nakhti) was an ancient Egyptian nomarch in Men'at Khufu in Middle Egypt in the Twelfth Dynasty. He is known from his decorated tomb chapel (BH 21) at Beni Hasan. The decoration of his tomb chapel is most likely unfinished. Only one wall is partly decorated with paintings, showing him standing in front of workers in the marshes. The inscriptions there provide the name and titles of Nakht (here called Nakhti). He was mayor and overseer of the eastern desert. Nakht is also mentioned in the tomb chapel of Khnumhotep II (BH3). In his chapel is a long biographical inscription reporting on the life of the Nomarch but also on his family. There is stated that Khnumhotep I installed Nakht as Nomarch in Men'at Khufu.

Nakht lived in the first half of the Twelfth Dynasty, most likely under Senusret I or Amenemhat II.
