= Netjernakht =

Ancient Egyptian official

- Nomarch of the 16th nome of Upper Egypt
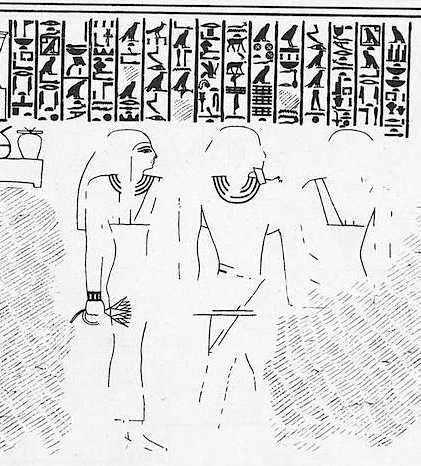
- Netjernakht between his mother and his wife, from his tomb BH23
- Successor: Khnumhotep II
- Dynasty: 12th Dynasty

Netjernakht was an Ancient Egyptian official known from his tomb chapel at Beni Hasan in Middle Egypt. He lived most likely in the Twelfth Dynasty. His exact date and position are disputed.

Netjernakht bears in his tomb chapel different titles. He was on the one side overseer of the eastern desert, but also mayor (ḥꜣty-ꜥ) and overseer of the priests of Horus, smiter of the rekhyt people. In his tomb chapel family members are depicted or mentioned. His mother was a woman called Arythotep, who was lady of the house and priestess of Hathor in Aryt. His wife was a woman called Herib with the titles lady of the house and priestess of Hathor in Aryt at all her places. His father is not mentioned in his tomb (Beni Hasan BH23) and remains unknown. In the tomb chapel there is an inscription by the Nomarch Khnumhotep II who states that he made this tomb for his father, Netjernakht. In Ancient Egyptian, father can also mean grandfather, or even great-grandfather. Therefore, the family relations between these two men and the succession of the office holders of overseer of the eastern desert, but also of the mayor remains unclear. According to Abdel Ghaffar Shedid, Netjernakht was the predecessor of Khnumhotep II.
