= Ipi Heryib =

Ipi with the good name Heryib was a local official of the Ancient Egyptian Sixth Dynasty who is known from his decorated tomb chapel at Beni Hasan.

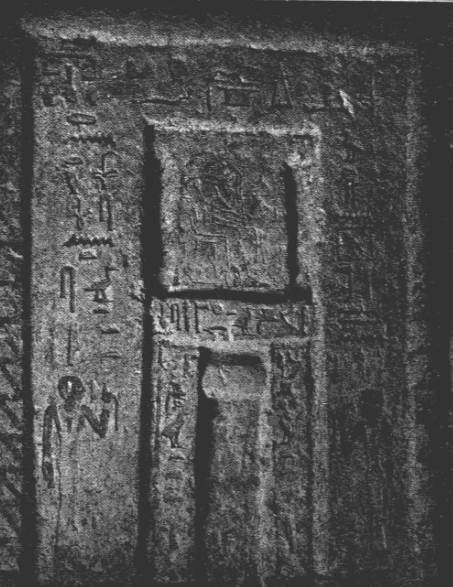
False door of Senet

In the decoration in his chapel he bears only two titles: he is ruler of an estate and sole friend. In his tomb appears also his a woman called Senet with the title the king's ornament, who was most likely his wife. She was the mother of two daughters; Teti and Tjeni. Tjeni had the title priestess of Hathor. Tjeni became the wife of a certain Bebi who was priest and was buried nearby.

The tomb chapel of Ipi is cut into the rock and consists of two rooms and several burial shafts cut into the floor of the chambers. There are three false doors cut into the west walls of the chambers. The walls of the chambers were decorated in relief with agricultural scenes and a scene showing Ipi in front of a richly loaded offering table.

The tomb was first recorded by John Garstang and later by an Australian team that published their documentation of the tomb in 2016.

== Literature ==
- Lashien, Miral (2016). Beni Hassan. Volume II: Two Old Kingdom tombs. With chapters by A. L. Mourad and A. Senussi and with contributions by A. L. Mourad, S. Shafik, A. Suleiman and N. Victor. Australian Centre for Egyptology: Reports 39. Oxford: Aris and Phillips. ISBN 9780856688614
- Garstang, John (1907): The burial customs of ancient Egypt as illustrated by tombs of the Middle Kingdom; being a report of excavations made in the necropolis of Beni Hassan during 1902-3-4, London, A. Constable online
