= Herwer =

- Town
- Interactive map of Herwer
- Country: Egypt
- Nome: Oryx nome

Herwer was an ancient Egyptian town in the 16th nome (Oryx nome) in Upper Egypt. It is mentioned in several ancient inscriptions dating from the Old, Middle and New Kingdom. The main deities of the place were Khnum and Heqet, both several times called lord or lady of Herwer. Perhaps in the Middle Kingdom, the place became the capital of the 16th Upper Egyptian nome. The local governor Amenemhat of that nome was indeed overseer of the priests of Khnum of Herwer. The place is often mentioned in the tombs of Beni Hasan.

D2 G36 D21 O49 or D2 D21 O49 ḥr wr in hieroglyphs Era: Old Kingdom (2686–2181 BC)	D2 G36 D21 M17 M17 X1 O49 ḥr wrjt in hieroglyphs Era: Middle Kingdom (2055–1650 BC)	D2 Z1 G36 D21 O49 ḥr wr in hieroglyphs Era: New Kingdom (1550–1069 BC)

The localisation of Herwer remains problematic. Yet however, in the Onomasticon of Amenope and in the Turin Papyrus 118.11, Herwer is referred to as north of Hermopolis, which excludes an identification with Antinoöpolis. Certainly, however, the place was on the west side of the Nile in the 16th Upper Egyptian nome as in the inscriptions in Beni Hasan, suggesting Herwer is identical to the modern village of Hur (Coptic: Ϩⲟⲩⲱⲣ) situated 11 km (6.8 miles) northwest of Hermopolis Magna.

== See also ==
- List of ancient Egyptian towns and cities
