= Khnumhotep I =

Egyptian nomarch

- Nomarch of the 16th nome of Upper Egypt
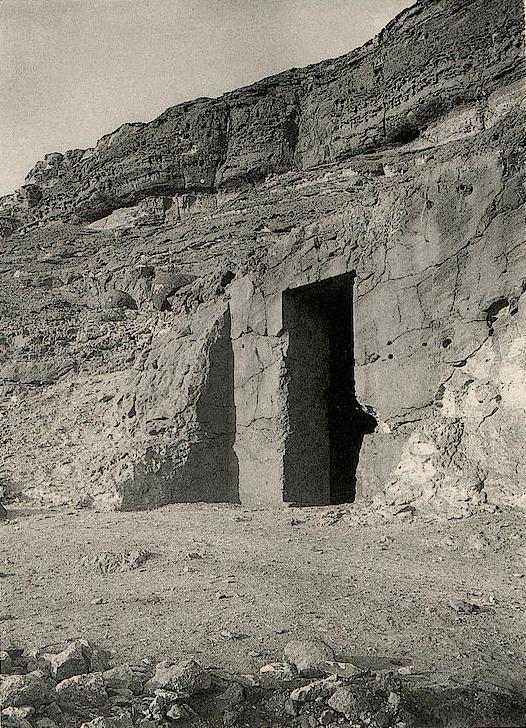
- Entrance to tomb of Khnumhotep I BH14 at Beni Hasan (c. 1890)
Egyptian name
E10 W9 Htp t p
- Successor: Nakht
- Dynasty: 12th Dynasty
- Pharaoh: Amenemhat I
- Burial: Beni Hasan tomb 14 (BH14)
- Spouse: Zatipy
- Father: Unknown
- Mother: Baqet
- Children: Nakht, Baqet

Khnumhotep I (ẖnmw-ḥtp, "Khnum is pleased") was an ancient Egyptian Great Chief of the Oryx nome (the 16th nome of Upper Egypt) during the reign of Pharaoh Amenemhat I of the 12th Dynasty, Middle Kingdom (early 20th century BCE).

== Biography ==
=== Family ===
Khnumhotep's mother was a lady called Baqet whilst his father's name is unknown. His family apparently replaced an earlier family of nomarchs who were active at Men'at Khufu during the second part of the 11th Dynasty, whose members were usually named Khety or Baqet (a prominent member of this family was Baqet III).

He married a woman named Zatipy who was his main wife. Lesser wives were Herit and Heryib. From a fourth wife, the name is not preserved.

=== Governor (Nomarch) ===
Khnumhotep I is the earliest known member of a powerful family of nomarchs and officials, housed in Men'at Khufu, which lasted for most of the 12th Dynasty; many of Khnumhotep's descendants were named after him, the most notable of them being his grandson Khnumhotep II, well known for his tomb's remarkable decorations. Some biographical information about Khnumhotep I came from his tomb at Beni Hasan (BH14) as well as from that of his grandson Khnumhotep II (BH3).

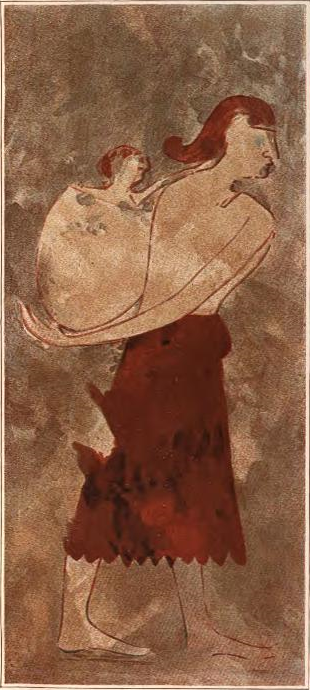
A Libyan or Kushite woman with her baby, depicted in Khnumhotep I's tomb

From the inscriptions in Khnumhotep's tomb is known that early in his career he accompanied Amenemhat I in a military expedition aimed to expel a foe from Egypt. The name of this enemy is deliberately omitted in order to prevent his unintended “immortality”, but was undoubtedly one of Amenemhat's rivals for the crown, possibly Segerseni. Ultimately, Amenemhat emerged victorious over “Nubians and Asiatics” and Khnumhotep was rewarded for his loyalty with the title count of Men'at Khufu. Khnumhotep I later was granted other titles such as great lord of the Oryx nome, hereditary prince and count, wearer of the royal seal, sole companion, and was also in charge of an important office at Nekhen.

=== Succession ===
After Khunmhotep's death, his titles passed to his son Nakht, then to a seemingly unrelated man called Amenemhat and then again to one of his relatives, Netjernakht. Khnumhotep I also had a daughter, Baqet, herself mother of the aforementioned Khnumhotep II who inherited the title of nomarch after Netjernakht. See "Nomarchs of the Oryx nome" for further notes about his genealogy.

== Death ==
=== Tomb BH14 ===
His tomb (no. 14) at Beni Hasan consists of a single rock cut offering chapel with two columns. The columns are gone by now. The walls of the chapel are painted although the paintings are today heavily faded. Within the chapel there are two shafts leading down to burial chambers, only one of them was finished. The west wall of the offering chapel, south of the entrance shows a long biographical inscription that is an important historical document. Under the inscription Khnumhotep I is shown on a boat hunting in the marshes. North of the entrance on the same wall is a false door and the family of Khnumhotep I is depicted. Especially the scene with the family members is much faded so that not all names are preserved. The North wall shows Khnumhotep I and his wife Zatipy standing in front of an offering table. In front of them in five registers are workmen at different tasks. In the top register a desert hunt is shown. On the same wall, Khumhotep I is again shown watching men working in the marshes. The east wall is fully dedicated to battle scenes. There is shown a siege of a fortress or town. There are fighting soldiers and wrestlers. The South wall is not well preserved and shows once Khnunhotep sitting and watching people and work as well as musicians playing music for him. A second time he is standing and is watching peasants working in the marshes.

== Bibliography ==
- James Henry Breasted, Ancient Records of Egypt, Volume I, The First to the Seventeenth Dynasties, Chicago: University of Chicago Press, 1906–1907, Available online.
- Wolfram Grajetzki, Court Officials of the Egyptian Middle Kingdom, London 2009.
- Miral Lashien, Anna-Latifa Mouradː Beni Hassan, Volume V, The Tomb of Khnumhotep I, Oxford 2019 ISBN 978-0-85668-842-3
- Percy Newberry, Beni Hasan. Part 1. London, England: Kegan Paul, Trench, Tubner & Co., Ltd., 1893. Available online.
