= Baqet III =

Ancient Egyptian governor

- Nomarch of the 16th nome of Upper Egypt
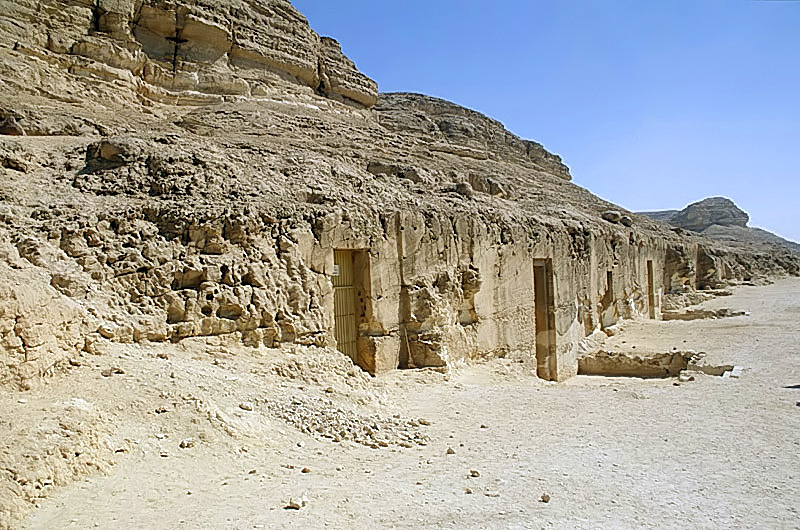
- Outside of the tombs of Baqet III and of his son Khety at Beni Hasan
Egyptian name
G29 q t M1
- Predecessor: Ramushenti?
- Successor: Khety?
- Dynasty: 11th Dynasty
- Pharaoh: Mentuhotep II
- Burial: Beni Hasan tomb 15 (BH15)
- Father: Ramushenti?
- Children: Khety?

Baqet III was an ancient Egyptian official and Great Chief of the Oryx nome (the 16th nome of Upper Egypt) during the 11th Dynasty in the 21st century BCE. Apart from the position of governor of the entire nome, Baqet III also held the titles haty-a, treasurer of the king of Lower Egypt, confidential friend, true royal acquaintance, and mayor of Nekheb.

As a son of his predecessor Ramushenti, he administered the governorate in the city of Men'at Khufu.

Realizing that the fate of the civil war was definitely in favor of the Thebans led by Mentuhotep II, Baqet cunningly broke the long neutrality of his territory and took the Theban side. After his death, his new loyalty allowed him to be succeeded by his probable son Khety and by his descendants until the time of Amenemhat I, when a family turnover took place in the governorship with the installation of Khnumhotep I.

== The tomb BH15 ==
Baqet III was buried in the necropolis of his clan in Beni Hasan inside the tomb no. 15. The tomb is composed of a cult chapel and an inner burial chamber, and is well known for its remarkable paintings.

The northern wall depicts Baqet and his wife in their daily life, the hunting of various animals including fantastic ones, and various artisans whilst working.

The eastern wall shows a fortress garrisoned by Egyptians and besieged by a mixed army composed of Egyptian infantry, Nubian bowmen and maybe Libyan slingers, likely representing a Theban offensive; on the same wall are also depicted an impressive number of wrestling positions and techniques.
Finally, the south wall mainly shows Baqet's funeral, but also some people playing senet.

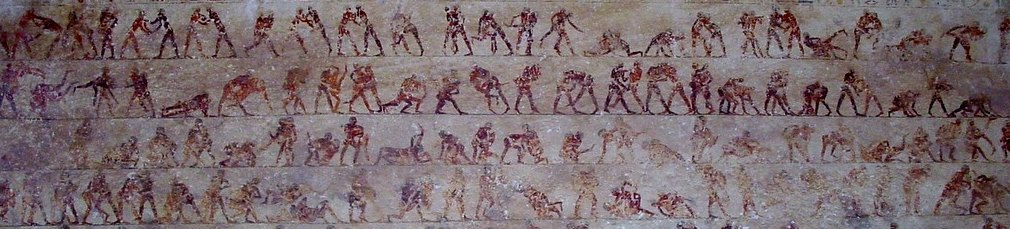
Some of the wrestling scenes
