= Hebenu =

- Location in Egypt
- Coordinates: 28°03′N 30°50′E
- Country: Egypt
- Governorate: Minya Governorate
- Time zone: UTC+2 (EET)
  - Summer (DST): UTC+3 (EEST)

Hebenu (Ancient Egyptian: 𓎛𓃀𓈖𓏌𓍢𓊖, Coptic: ⲧϩⲁⲃⲓⲛ, ⲡⲙⲁⲛϩⲁⲃⲓⲛ, romanized: t-Habin, p-Manhabin, Arabic: حفن, romanized: Hafn) or Alabastron (Koine Greek: Ἀλάβαστρων πόλις) was a city in ancient Egypt. It was located in Middle Egypt, or the Heptanomy, and belonged to the Hare nome (𓉆. It was the early capital of the Oryx nome (𓉇. The modern village of Zawiyat al-Amwat (Arabic: زاويـــة الأمـــوات) (Minya Governorate) is built on the site where the ancient city stood.

== Geography ==
Alabastron was located on the east bank of the Nile north of Antinoöpolis and Hermopolis. It is placed in present-day el-Kom el-Ahmar about 10 kilometers south of present-day Minya. Ptolemy placed the city in Middle Egypt, but Pliny the Elder in Upper Egypt proper in the Thebaid.

== History ==
Hebenu was the early capital of the Oryx nome. The Greek name Hipponon (Ancient Greek: Ἱππώνων, Hippōnōn) derived from the Egyptian name is also mentioned for the city in this era, but it should not be confused with the Hipponon further north in the 18th or 20th nomes near el Hiba.

In other times, the city was counted as part of the Hare nome. Near it were quarries of alabaster, from which it got its later Greek name. The name is known from the Hellenistic period, i.e. the time of the Ptolemaic Kingdom and Roman Egypt, the second half of the century. until the beginning. After this, the city is more often referred to as Alabastrine until late antiquity until the fifthth century.

== Buildings and findings ==
The city had temples dedicated to Horus and Pakhet. In addition to Kom el-Ahmar, archaeological sites related to the city include Zawyet el-Amwet, Zawyet el-Maiyitin (Zawiet El-Maietin/Zawyet el-Meitin) and Zawyet el-Sultan (Zawiyat al-Sultan), where, among other things, graves have been found.

Hebenu in hieroglyphs
H b N35 W24 V1 O49
or
V28 D58 N35 W24 G43 O49
Ḥbnw
to pierce (triumph?)

== See also ==
- List of ancient Egyptian towns and cities

== Literature ==
- Hans Bonnet: Hebenu in: Lexikon der ägyptischen Religionsgeschichte. Hamburg 2000, ISBN 3-937872-08-6, p. 284. (in German)
- Farouk Gomaa: Die Besiedlung Ägyptens während des Mittleren Reiches, 1. Oberägypten und das Fayyum. Wiesbaden 1986, ISBN 3-88226-279-6, p. 319–321. (in German)
- Rainer Hannig: Großes Handwörterbuch Ägyptisch-Deutsch: (2800-950 v. Chr.). By Zabern, Mainz 2006, ISBN 3-8053-1771-9, p. 1172. (in German)
