= Beni Hasan =

Village and archaeological site in Middle Egypt

- بني حسن (Arabic)
- Bani Hasan; Beni Hassan; Beni-Hassan
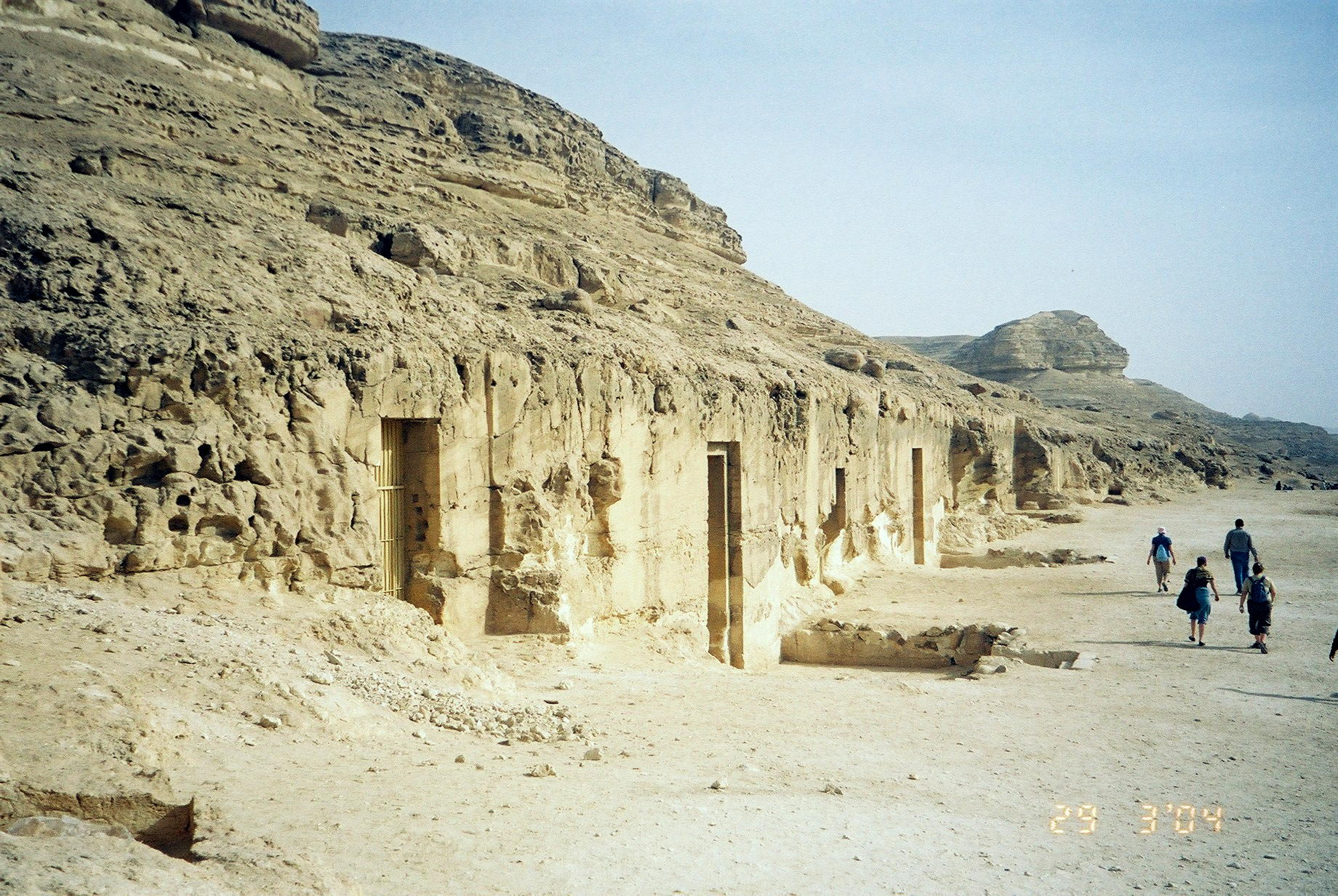
- The tombs of Khety and Baqet III

- Location in Egypt
- 27.931389°N 30.875281°E
- Type: Necropolis
- Periods: Late Old Kingdom to the Middle Kingdom
- Cultures: Ancient Egyptian
- Location: Minya Governorate, Egypt
- Nearest city: Minya

Site notes
- Excavation dates: 1890–1894; 1902–1904; since 2010
- Archaeologists: Edme-François Jomard; Percy E. Newberry; John Garstang; Naguib Kanawati
- Governing body: Ministry of Tourism and Antiquities
- Public access: Limited
- Website: egymonuments.gov.eg/en/archaeological-sites/beni-hasan/

Beni Hasan (also written Bani Hasan, Beni Hassan or Beni-Hassan; Arabic: بني حسن) is an ancient Egyptian funerary site cut into the limestone cliffs that form the eastern edge of the Nile Valley. It lies in Middle Egypt, on the east bank of the Nile about 20 kilometers (12 mi) south of Minya. Its monumental tombs were excavated north of the modern village, approximately halfway up the cliff and overlooking the valley.

During the Middle Kingdom, Beni Hasan was the principal cemetery of the sixteenth nome of Upper Egypt, the administrative district known as the Oryx nome. Its capital was the ancient town of Hebenu, identified with Zawyet Sultan, on the east bank of the Nile about 7 kilometers (4 mi) south of Minya; the locality is also known as Zawyet el-Maiyitin, Zawyet al-Amwat and Kom el-Ahmar. The funerary inscriptions also mention Menat Khufu, an Egyptian place-name translated as "the nurse city of Khufu", where some of the nobles buried at Beni Hasan resided, although the settlement has not been securely located.

The funerary complex contains burials made between the end of the third and the beginning of the second millennium BC, from the late Old Kingdom to the Middle Kingdom. The monumental tombs of the upper cemetery belong chiefly to the Eleventh and Twelfth Dynasties. At the foot of the slope are the earliest graves of the main group, dated to the end of the Sixth Dynasty or the transition to the First Intermediate Period. Farther down the slope, the lower cemetery comprises about 900 graves, 888 of which were recorded during the excavations of 1902–1904.

The upper cemetery contains 39 rock-cut tombs, twelve of which retain painted scenes showing agricultural and craft activities, hunting, games, fighting and the arrival of foreign groups. In tomb BH3 of Khnumhotep II, the decoration includes the procession of the Aamu, fig gathering, and scenes of fishing and fowling in the marshes.

South of the cemetery, within a wadi opening east of the village, is an Eighteenth-Dynasty rock-cut temple dedicated to the local goddess Pakhet and built by Hatshepsut. The designation "Cave of Artemis", or Speos Artemidos, derives from the Greek name of the sanctuary and the identification of Pakhet with Artemis.

== Cemetery ==
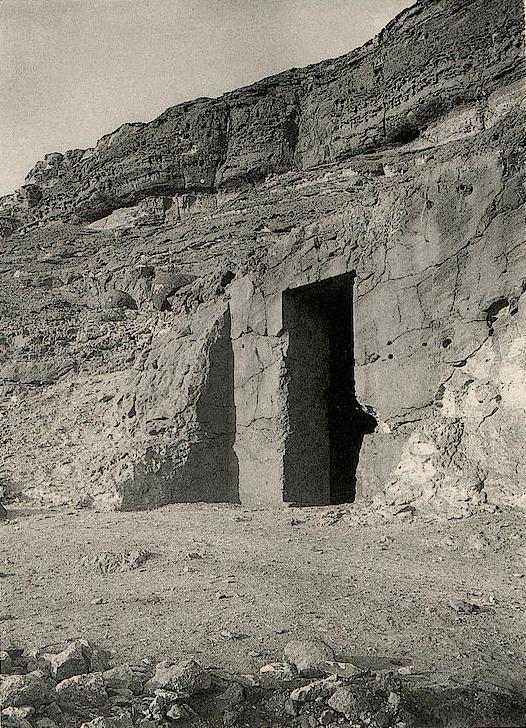
Entrance to tomb BH14 of Khnumhotep I.

The burials are divided between an upper zone of monumental rock-cut tombs and a lower cemetery consisting mainly of shaft tombs, in which the burial chamber was reached through a vertical opening. Thirty-nine tombs were recorded in the upper zone, twelve of which bore inscriptions: eight belonged to governors of the Oryx nome, two to princes, one to the son of a prince and one to a royal scribe. Seven of the tombs belonged to successive governors, alongside decorated and undecorated burials of other high-ranking provincial officials.

Provincial governors, conventionally described as nomarchs, were buried in rock-cut tombs excavated in the limestone cliff; well-known examples include the tombs of Amenemhat, Khnumhotep II, Baqet III and Khety. During the Old Kingdom and the first half of the Middle Kingdom, the office of nomarch appears often to have been hereditary, with local dynasties remaining at the head of the same provinces for several generations; the nomarch nevertheless remained a representative of the king and directly under royal authority. The situation appears to change under Senusret III, when provincial dignitaries and the heirs of the great families of governors ceased to build or excavate immense funerary complexes. Connor cautions that this impression may partly reflect the nature of the surviving evidence and that, rather than a structural change or a decline in the power of provincial families, it may indicate a change in the ways power was expressed and in funerary practices.

Paintings and inscriptions preserved in numerous tombs record the identities, social rank and administrative offices of their owners. The rock-cut chapels vary in size and arrangement; more elaborate examples include external courts or porticoes, halls supported by pillars or columns, niches or small statue shrines, and shafts leading to the burial chambers.

=== Upper cemetery ===
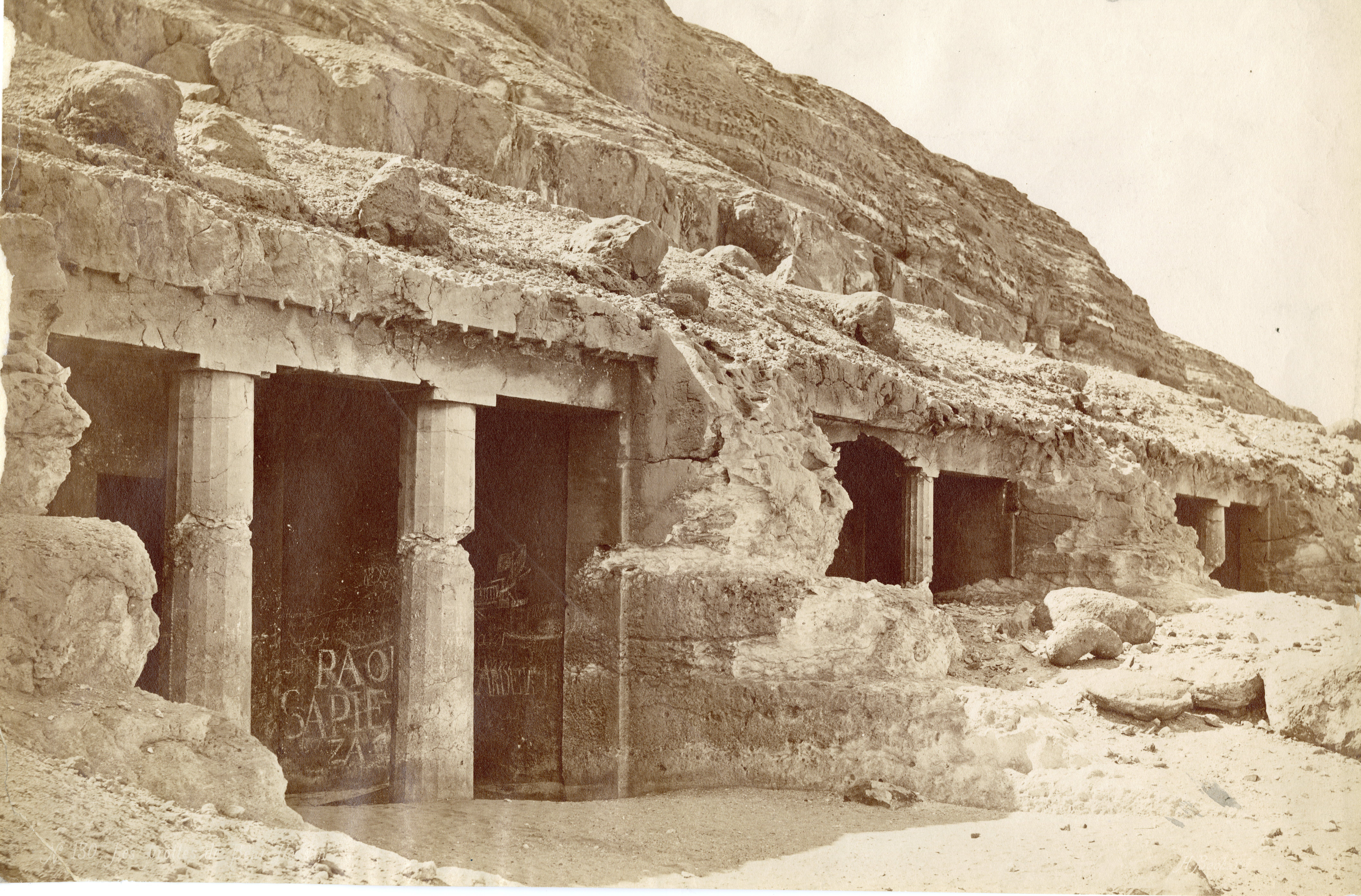
Tombs BH3, BH4 and BH5: the tombs of Khnumhotep II and Khnumhotep IV are in the foreground. Photograph by Henri Béchard, 1870–1880, Museo Egizio photographic archive, INV07_002.

The upper sector contains 39 monumental tombs, all cut into the same limestone stratum approximately halfway up the cliff. Their entrances follow one another almost continuously along a natural terrace, enlarged during the cutting of the chapels, for about a quarter of a mile. The largest tombs belonged to governors of the Oryx nome and other high-ranking provincial officials.

Arranged on a north–south axis, the 39 tombs are divided by a natural break in the terrace into a northern group of thirteen and a southern group of twenty-six. The division partly corresponds to chronology, although the dates of some monuments remain uncertain; the southern tombs are generally regarded as earlier, whereas the owners of several northern tombs, including Khnumhotep I, Amenemhat and Khnumhotep II, can be placed more securely in the Twelfth Dynasty. From the southern end northwards, examples attributed to the Eleventh Dynasty give way to increasingly large and complex tombs culminating in the monuments of the Twelfth Dynasty.

The tombs of high officials contained a chapel cut into the rock, sometimes preceded by a court or portico. One or more shafts, or more rarely sloping corridors, descended from the chapel to subterranean burial chambers. In the larger complexes, rows of pillars or columns divided the interior and led towards a small niche or statue shrine in the eastern wall, while vertical shafts normally opened in the chapel floor.

=== Decoration and inscriptions ===
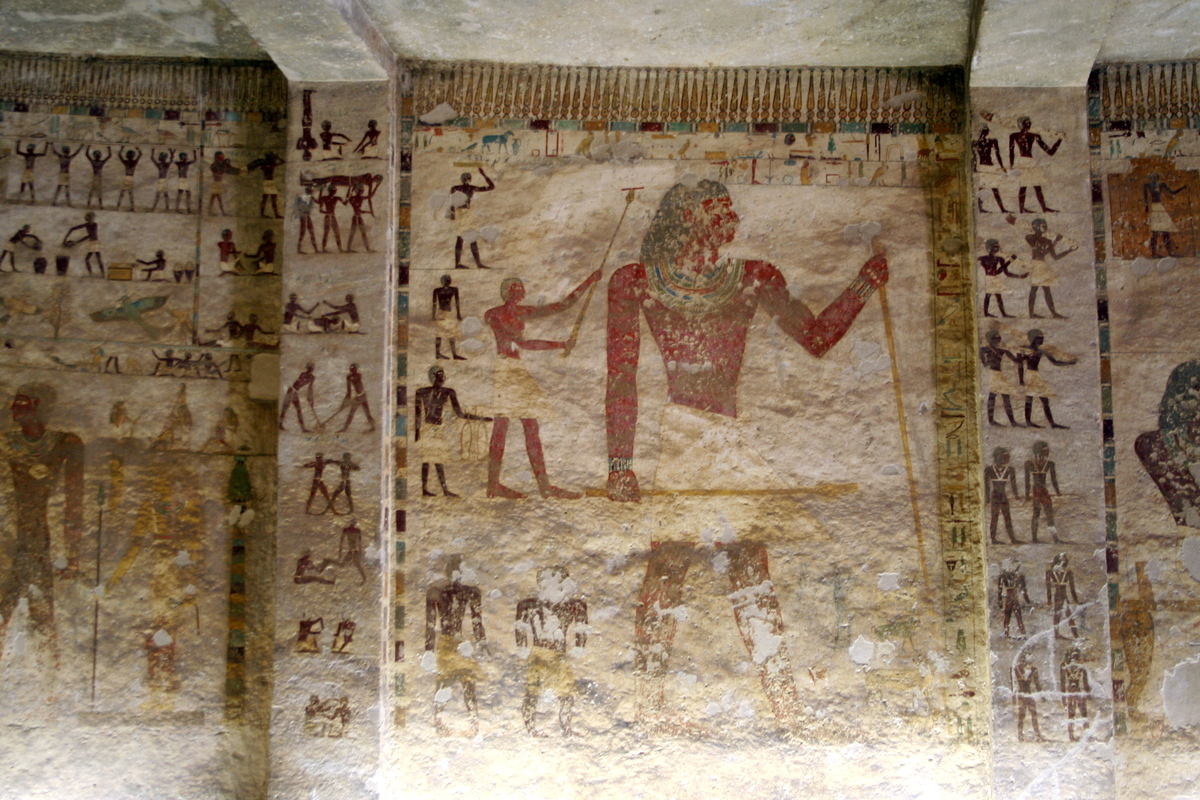
Khety represented in tomb BH17.

Twelve of the 39 tombs in the upper cemetery retain painted wall scenes showing agricultural and craft activities, hunting, games, fighting and the arrival of foreign groups, while the inscriptions preserve the names and titles of their owners.

While recording the chapels, the Archaeological Survey of Egypt produced facsimiles, colour plates, drawings and transcriptions of the paintings and inscriptions; these were published in the four volumes of Beni Hasan issued between 1893 and 1900. In tomb BH14 of Khnumhotep I, the paintings are now in poor condition: the scenes have been affected by time, human intervention, exposure to the elements and salt encrustation, and some details are now completely obliterated.

The lower parts of all four walls of the burial chamber of Baqet II in tomb BH33 are covered with texts in hieratic and cursive hieroglyphs. The sequence begins on the west wall with an abridged form of a liturgy attested in the Pyramid Texts, continues on the south and east walls with Pyramid Text spells PT 221 and PT 222, and ends on the north wall with Coffin Text spell CT 225.

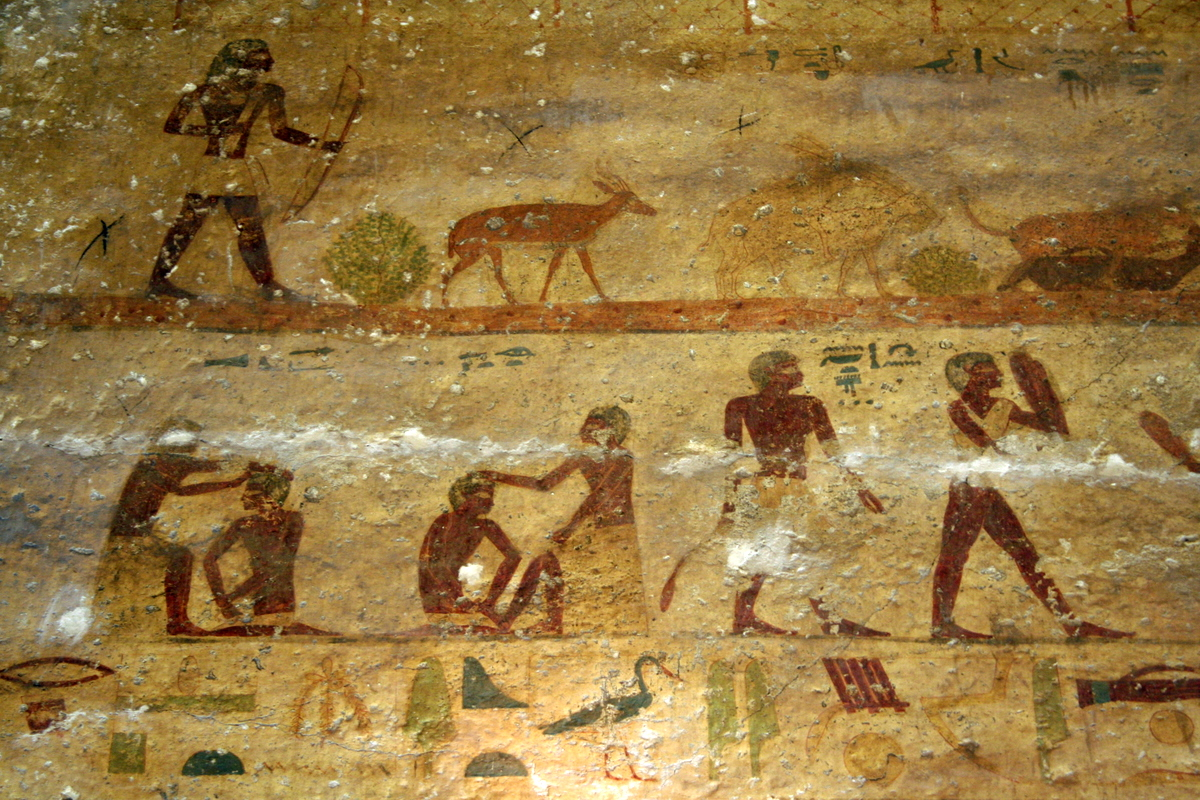
Painted decoration at Beni Hasan

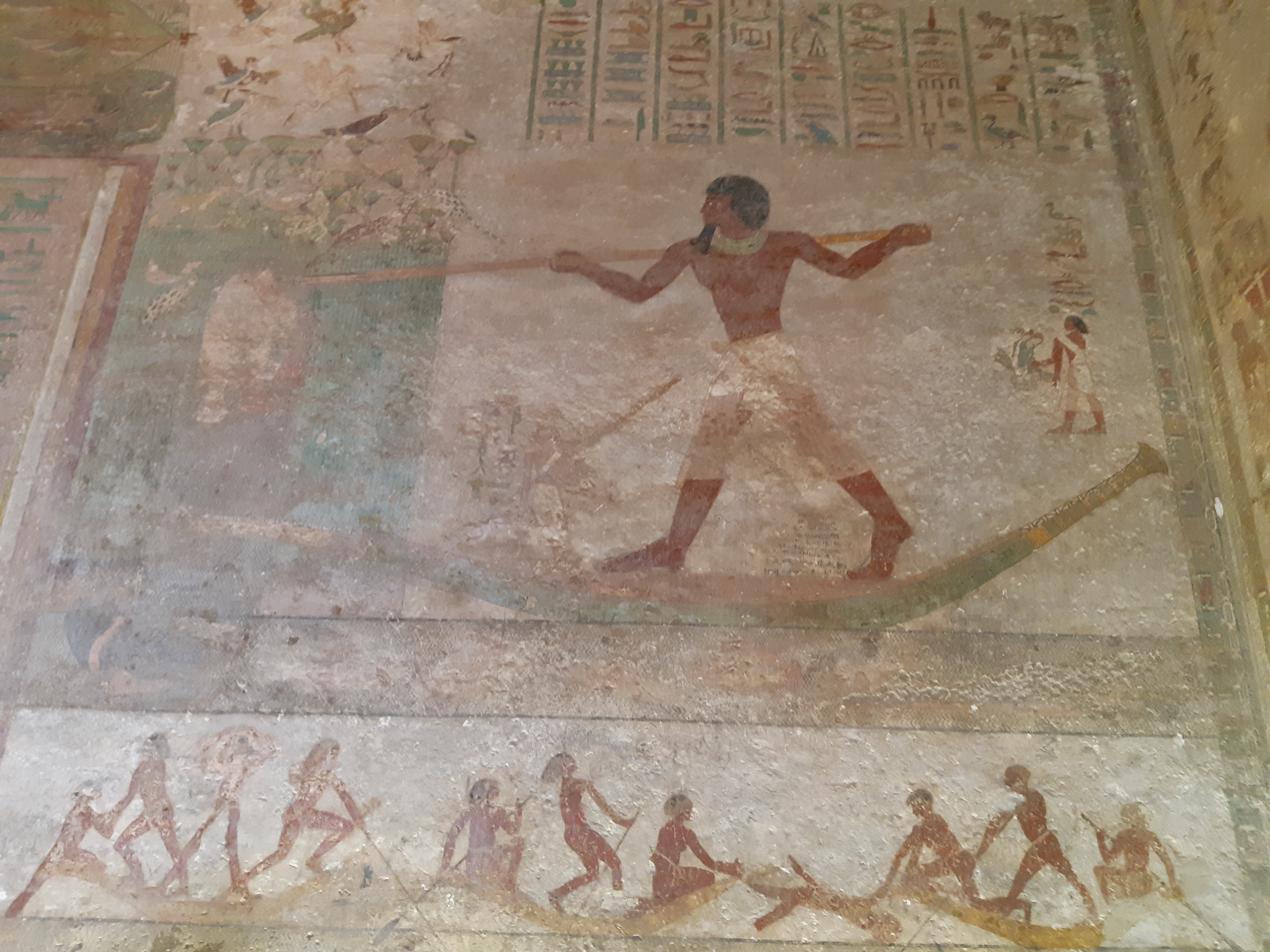
Tomb BH3 of Khnumhotep II

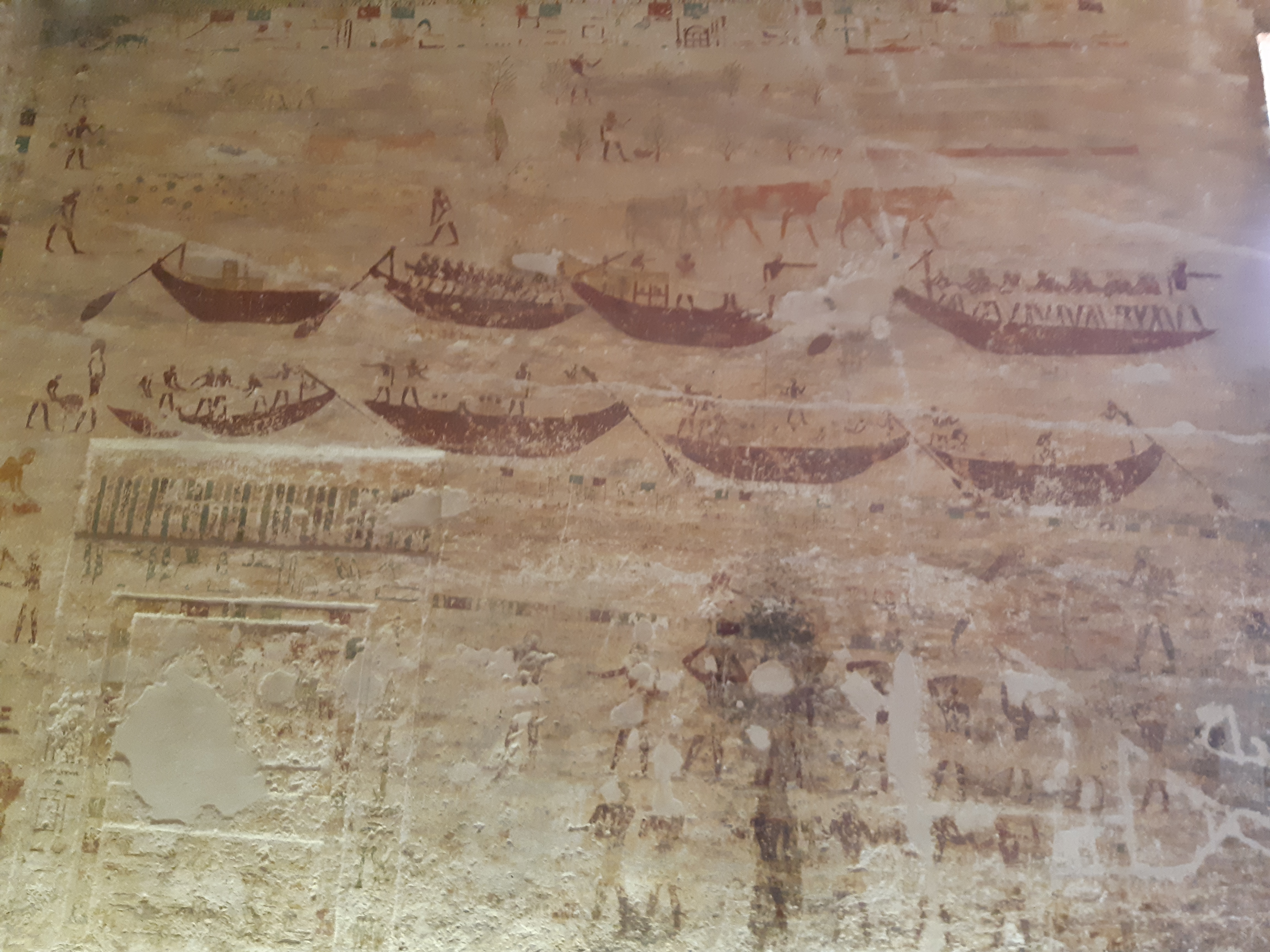
Painted decoration at Beni Hasan

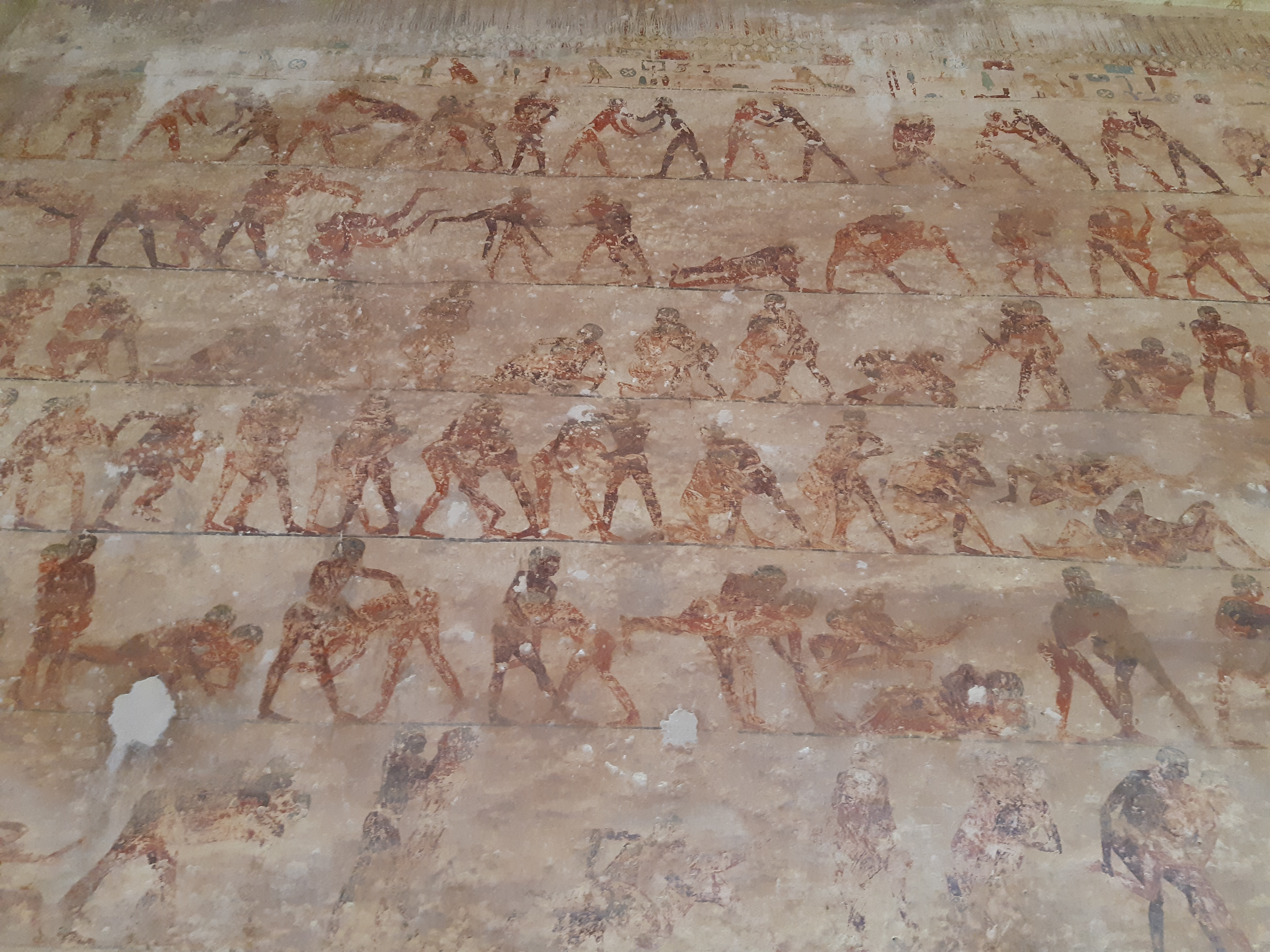
Painted decoration at Beni Hasan

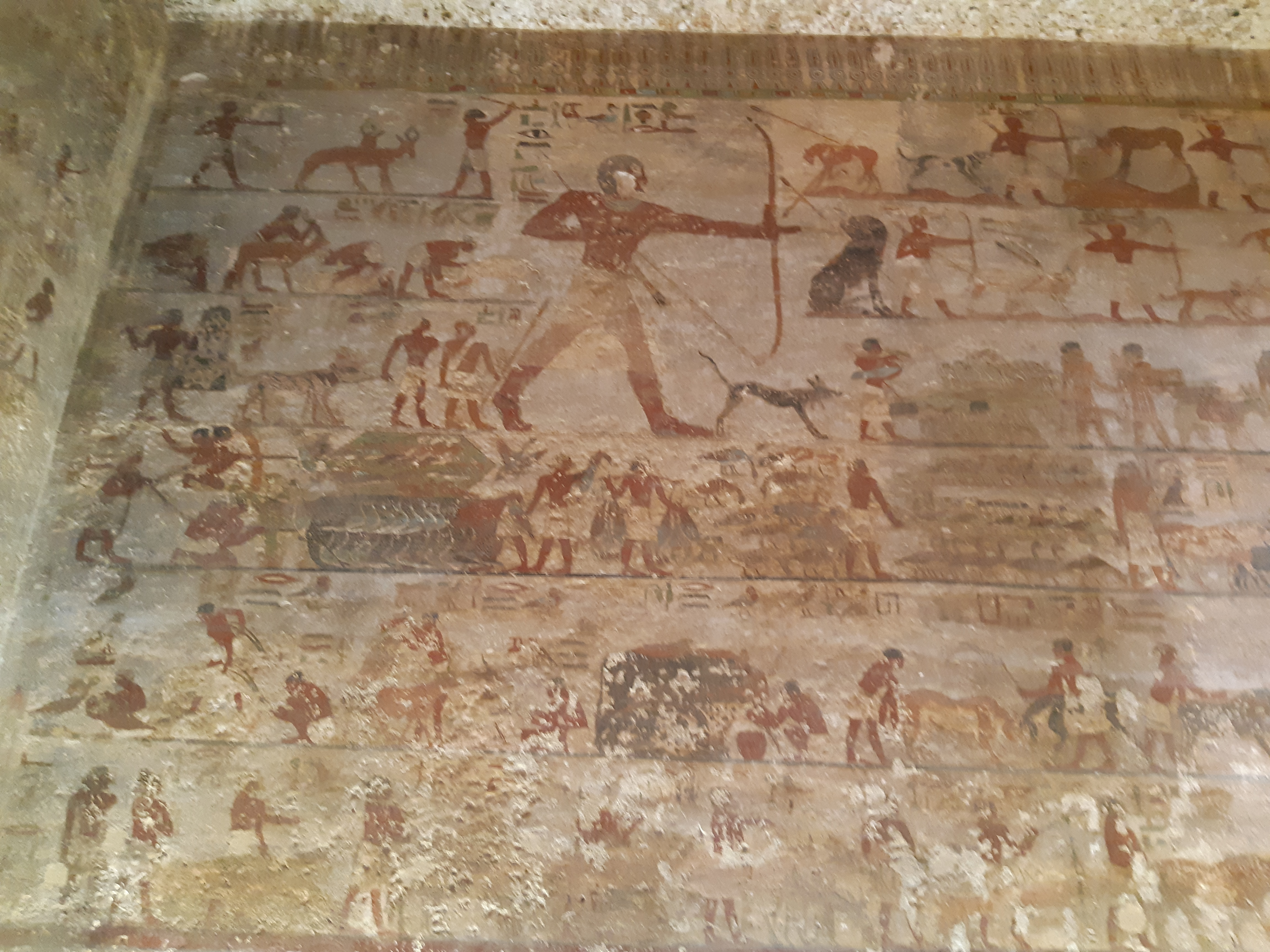
Painted decoration at Beni Hasan

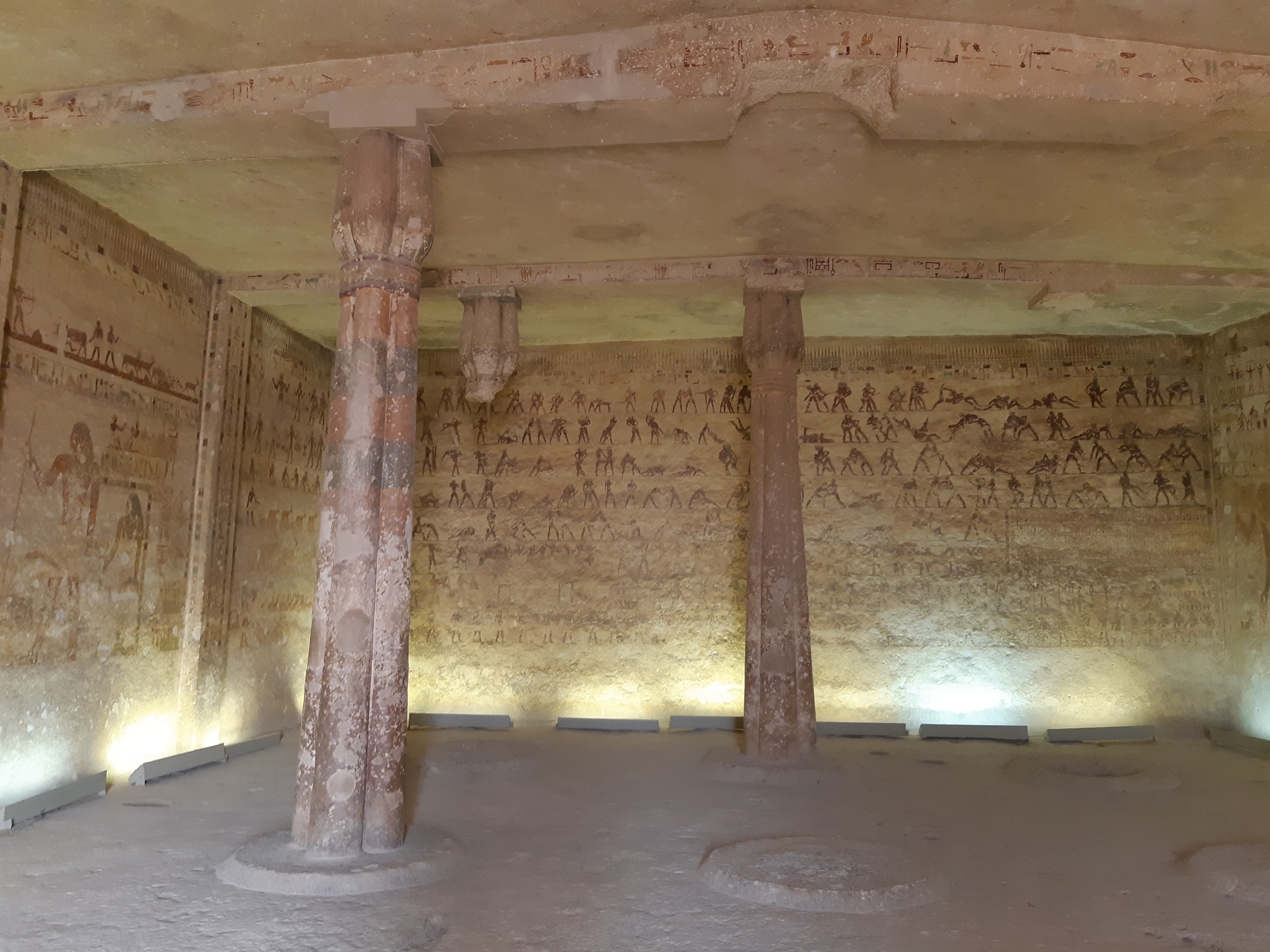
Painted decoration at Beni Hasan

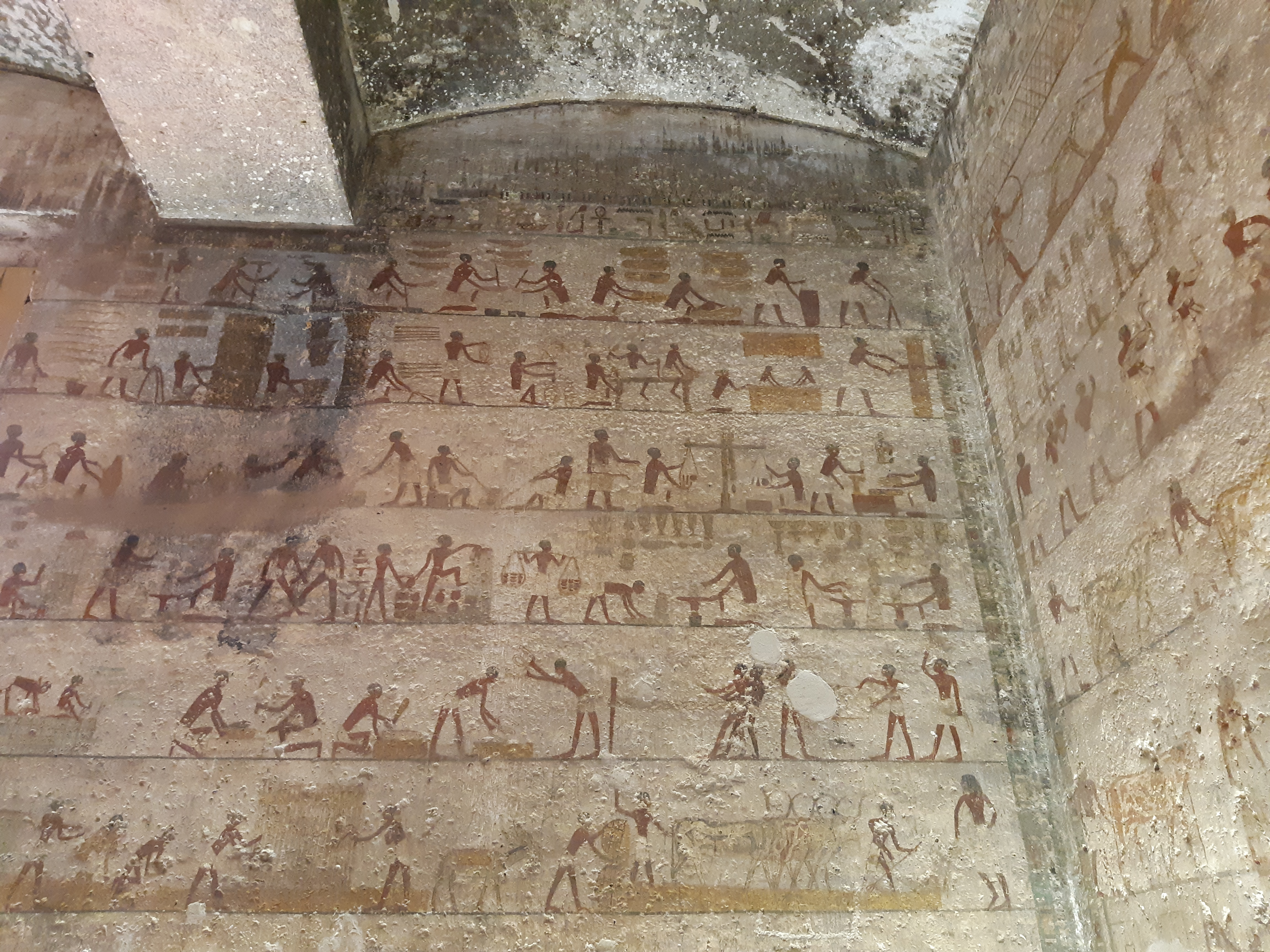
Painted decoration at Beni Hasan

=== Lower cemetery ===
In the lower cemetery, John Garstang excavated 888 tombs, used principally for officials, courtiers and people of lower rank than the owners of the monumental cliff tombs. Two decorated rock cut tombs, belonging to Ipi Heryib and Bebi, however belong to the Old Kingdom. A Macquarie University project studying the material dispersed among museums and other collections after the 1902–1904 campaigns has reconstructed a cemetery sector of about 900 tombs and traced more than 2,000 objects in 114 institutions.

Approximately 800 of the 888 burials followed a simple recurring plan: a vertical shaft, generally quadrangular in plan, and a small chamber or recess opening on the south side at its base, where the coffin and funerary equipment were placed. The shafts were usually between 5 and 7 m (16 and 23 ft) deep; shallower examples reached about 3 m (9.8 ft), whereas the deepest were approximately 10 m (33 ft). The smallest chambers provided little more than the space needed for a coffin and offerings.

== Notable tombs ==
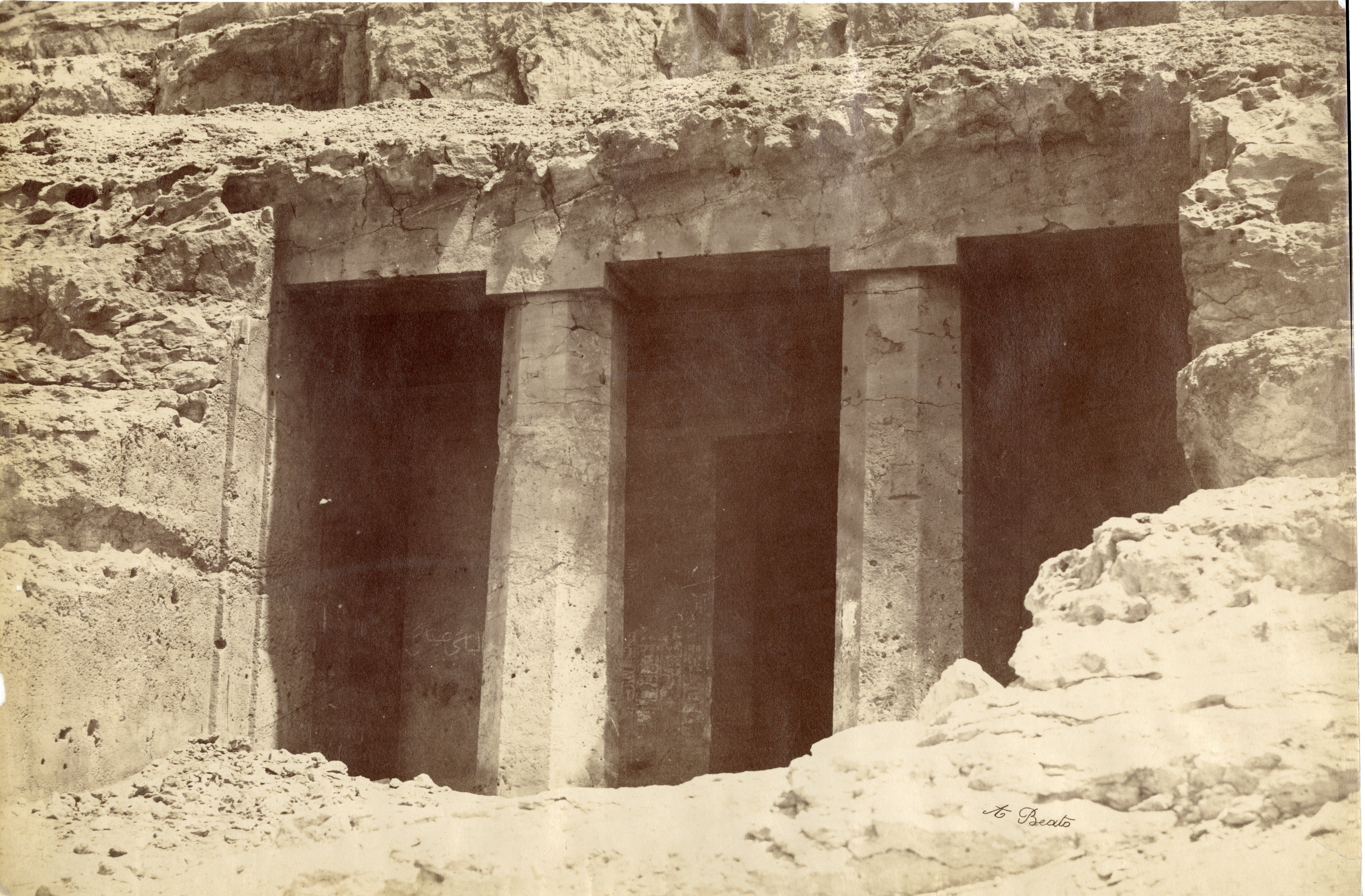
Entrance to tomb BH2 of Amenemhat, known as Ameny. Photograph by Antonio Beato, 1870–1888, Museo Egizio photographic archive, INV27_008.

Four of the 39 upper tombs are open to visitors: those of Amenemhat, Khnumhotep II, Baqet III and Khety.

Tomb BH2 – Amenemhat

Amenemhat, also called Ameny, was the last known governor of the Oryx nome and held office for about twenty-five years during the reign of Senusret I. The chapel is reached by a causeway and preceded by a court with a two-columned portico. A shrine cut into the eastern wall contains a statue group of the governor, his wife Hetepet and his mother Henu. The paintings show agriculture, crafts, fishing and fowling, while the ceiling imitates beams and matting through multicoloured geometric patterns.

Tomb BH3 – Khnumhotep II

Khnumhotep II, Overseer of the Eastern Desert during the reign of Senusret II, had his chapel preceded by a court and a portico with two fluted columns. The chapel contains two burial shafts and a hall originally supported by four columns, leading to a shrine for the owner's statue. An inscription extending over 222 columns recounts his life. On the north wall, fifteen Aamu are depicted, while the accompanying inscription records a total of 37; the text associates their arrival with mesdemet, eye-paint. The leader is named Abisharie and bears the title heqa-khasut, "ruler of the hill-lands".

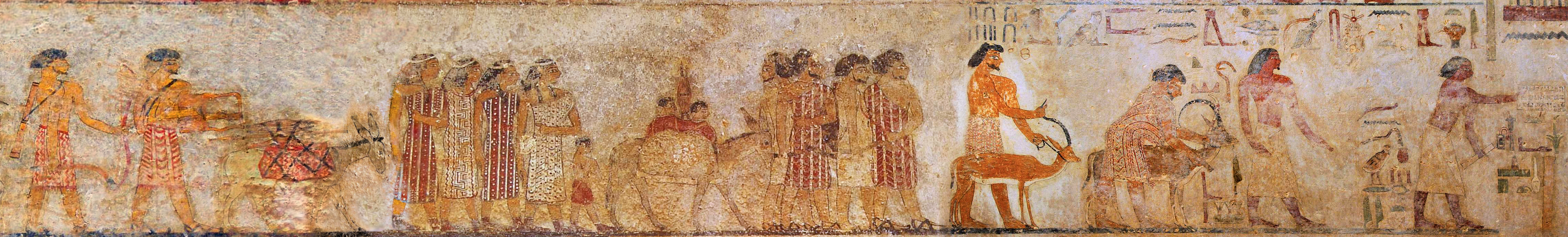
Composite reconstruction of the procession of the Aamu in tomb BH3 of Khnumhotep II; fifteen figures are depicted, while the inscription records a total of 37.

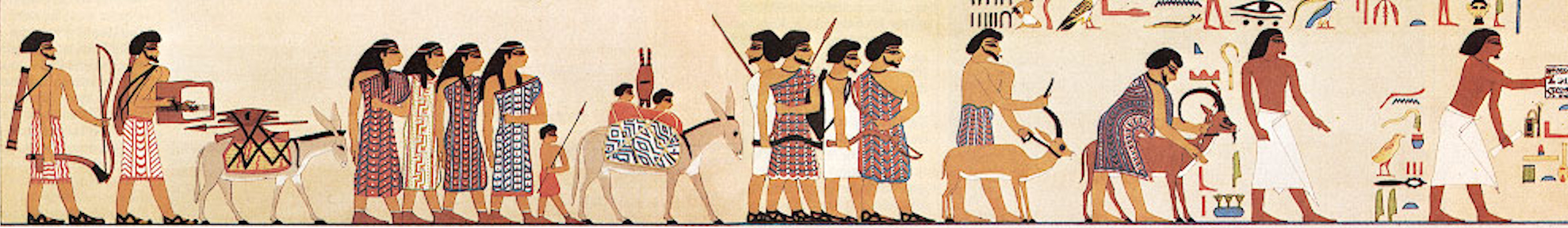
Drawing of the procession of the Aamu; their leader, Abisharie, bears the title heqa-khasut, "ruler of the hill-lands".

Tomb BH4 – Khnumhotep IV

The unfinished chapel belongs to the northern group and was probably made for Khnumhotep IV. Its construction is assigned to the reign of Senusret II or Senusret III, or to a slightly later period.

Tomb BH13 – Khnumhotep

Khnumhotep, an official bearing the title of royal scribe, had a rock-cut chapel of which only parts of the inscriptions and decoration survive.

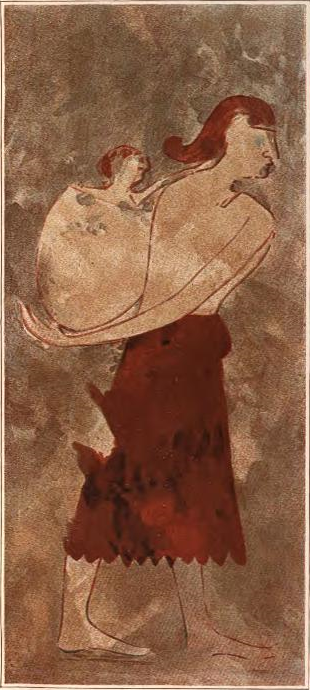
One of the women in the group identified as Libyan, carrying a child, in tomb BH14.

Tomb BH14 – Khnumhotep I

Khnumhotep I, the first known governor of the Oryx nome at the beginning of the Twelfth Dynasty, received several high appointments from Amenemhat I. The inscriptions and paintings include a biographical account and scenes of daily activities, desert hunting and military action.

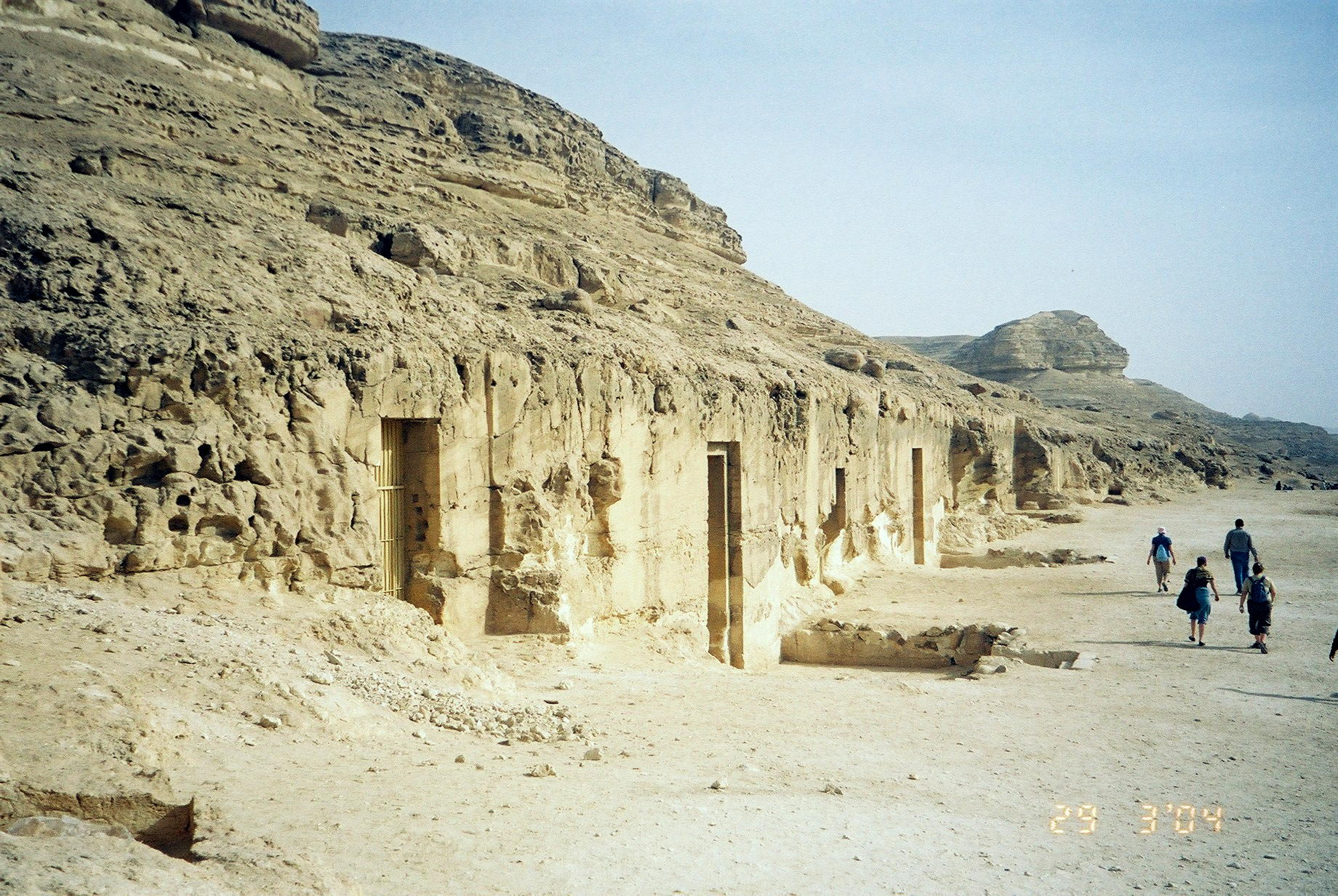
Entrances to tombs BH15 of Baqet III and BH17 of Khety.

Tomb BH15 – Baqet III

Baqet III, son of Ramushenti and governor of the Oryx nome, belonged to the southern group, generally considered the earlier part of the cemetery and assigned to the initial phase of the Middle Kingdom. His chapel was preceded by a court and had a small shrine in the south-eastern corner with a false door and an offering table. The walls combine scenes of hunting and fishing, craftsmen at work, tax collection, animals, a battle and the siege of a fortress with a wrestling cycle occupying the east wall. The cycle contains 220 pairs of wrestlers; in each pair one figure is painted red and the other dark brown so that the interaction between the two men is clearly visible.

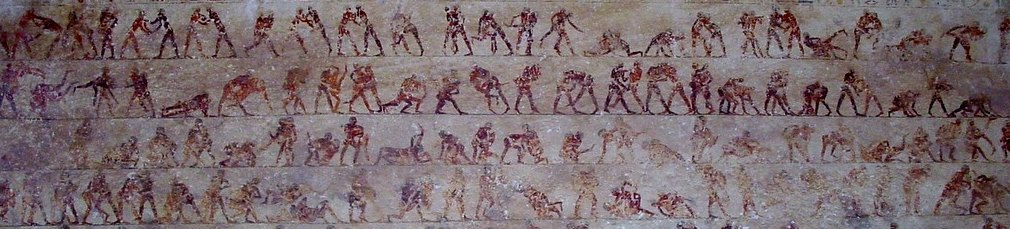
Detail of the wrestling scenes in tomb BH15.

Tomb BH17 – Khety

Khety, governor of the sixteenth nome of Upper Egypt, was buried in a tomb dated approximately to 2055–1956 BC. The chapel was originally supported by two rows of three columns with lotus-flower capitals; only one column in each row survives intact. The east wall shows military training, an assault on fortified structures and 122 pairs of wrestlers. Other walls depict desert hunting, woodworking, spinning, weaving, board games, acrobatics, wine production, music and sports.

Tomb BH21 – Nakht

Nakht, also called Nekhta, is shown before workers in a marshland setting within an unfinished decorative scheme; the surviving inscriptions preserve his name and titles.

Tomb BH23 – Netjernakht

Netjernakht, a local governor and Overseer of the Eastern Desert, left both the decoration and the inscriptions of his chapel unfinished.

Tomb BH27 – Ramushenti

Ramushenti, a provincial official of the Oryx nome, was buried in a complex comprising a rock-cut chamber and several burial shafts; no painted decoration survives in the chapel.

Tomb BH29 – Baqet I

Baqet I, one of the governors buried in the southern group of the upper cemetery, generally considered the earliest group, had a large columnless chapel cut entirely into the rock and crossed by burial shafts opening in its floor.

Tomb BH33 – Baqet II

Baqet II, governor of the Oryx nome, occupied one of the tombs in the southern group. A simple columnless chapel lies above the burial apartment, whose chamber preserves an extensive corpus of hieratic and cursive-hieroglyphic funerary texts.

== Exploration and research ==
=== Early documentation ===
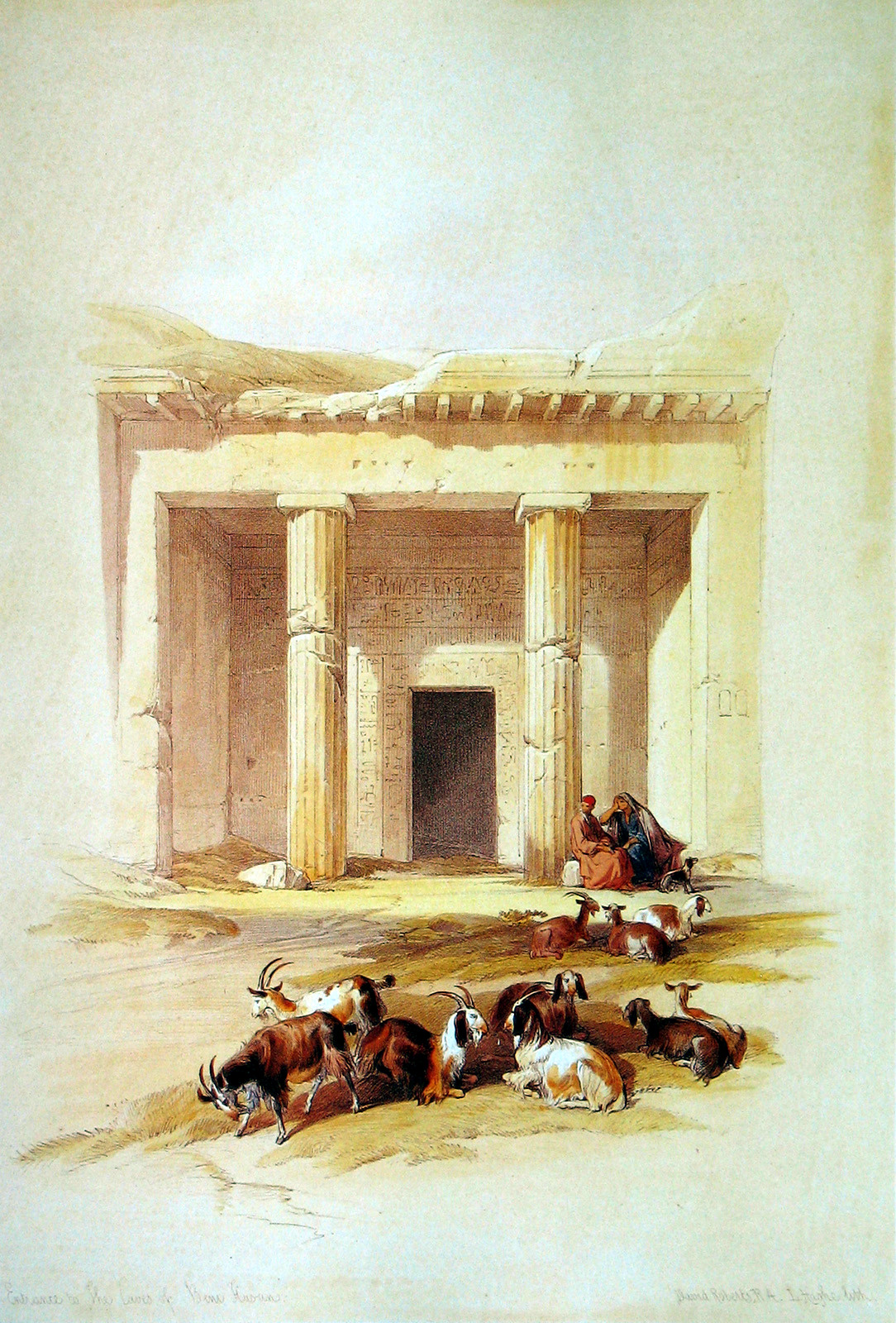
Entrance to the Caves of Beni Hassan, after a drawing made on the spot by David Roberts and published in Egypt and Nubia.

The first detailed European description of some Beni Hasan tombs dates to 1798, when Edme François Jomard, a member of the Commission des Sciences et des Arts accompanying the French expedition to Egypt, studied tombs BH15 and BH17. His results were subsequently published in the Description de l'Égypte.

Between 12 and 15 March 1825, James Burton visited the tombs and left notes and copies in his manuscripts. Three years later, members of the Franco-Tuscan expedition led by Jean-François Champollion and Ippolito Rosellini copied inscriptions and paintings, later reproduced in illustrated publications devoted to the expedition. Robert Hay, working at the site in the same year, made drawings from which coloured plates were subsequently prepared.

In 1834, John Gardner Wilkinson redrew numerous paintings to scale and used them in his studies of ancient Egyptian customs. In 1842, the Prussian expedition led by Karl Richard Lepsius continued the documentation of the complex, copying scenes and inscriptions later published in the Denkmäler aus Ägypten und Äthiopien.

David Roberts also depicted the tombs of Beni Hasan in a view published in Egypt and Nubia from a drawing made on the spot.

The photographic archive of the Museo Egizio in Turin holds four nineteenth-century albumen prints of the rock-cut cemetery at Beni Hasan.

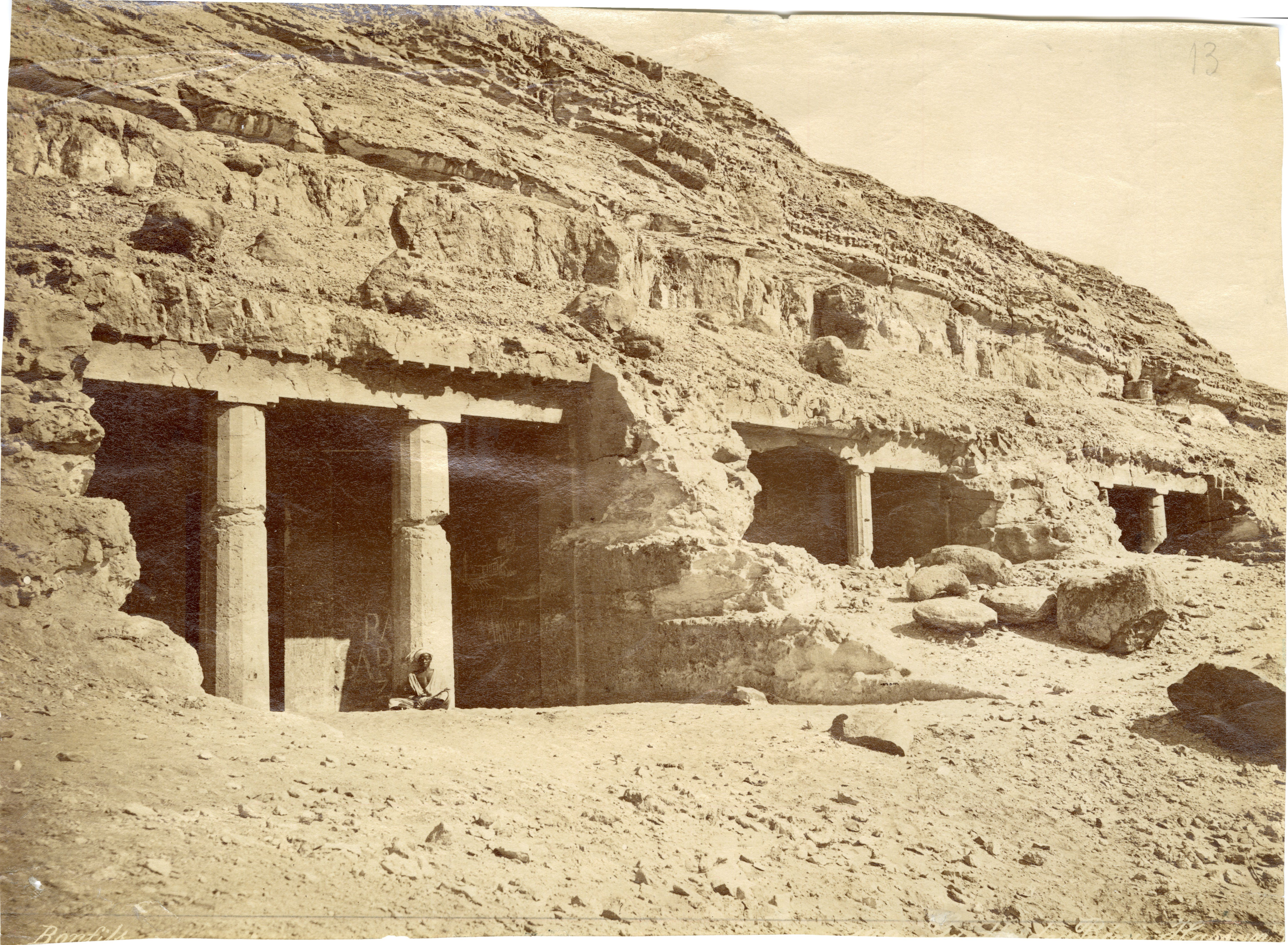
Tombs BH3, BH4 and BH5 photographed by Félix Bonfils in 1877.

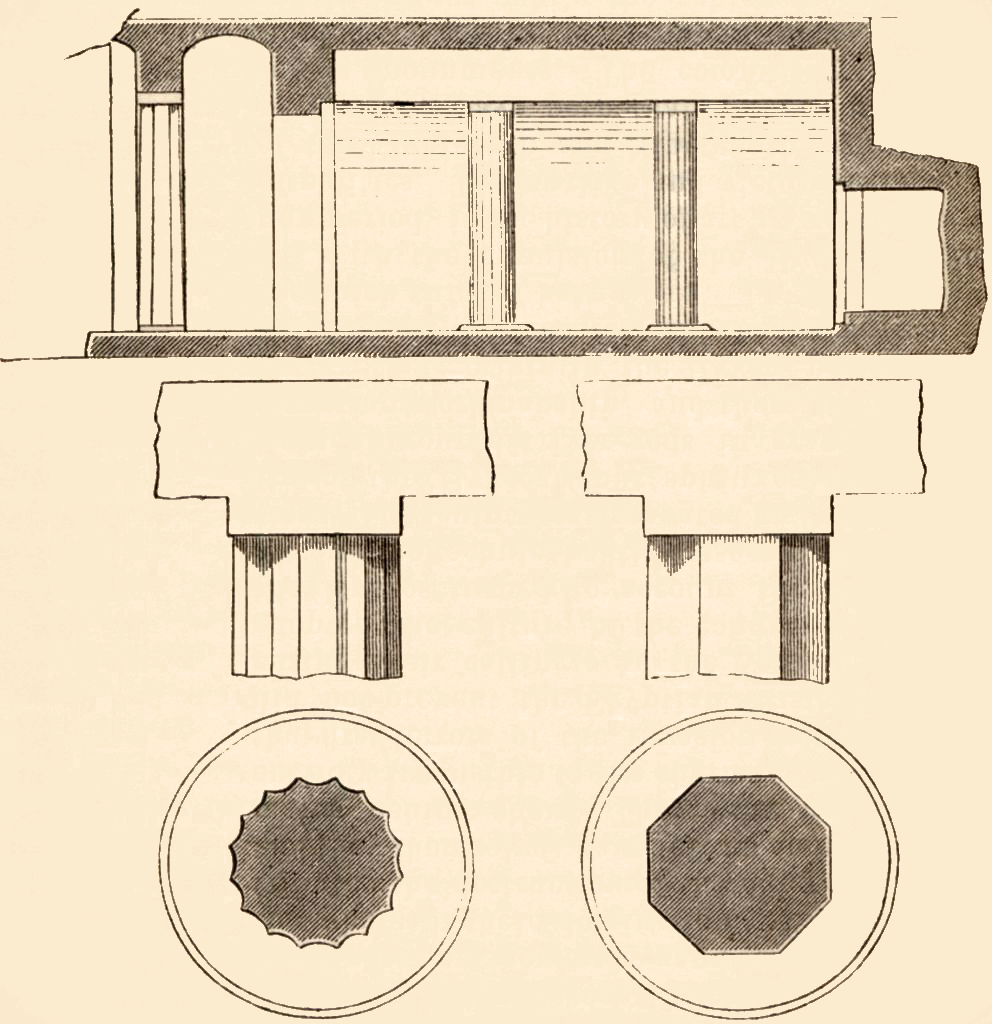
Section and columns of a tomb at Beni Hasan, published in 1885.

=== Archaeological Survey of Egypt ===
The first campaign of the Archaeological Survey of Egypt, directed in the field by Percy Newberry, took place in the 1890–1891 season. A second campaign followed in 1891–1892, with further work continuing to 1894. The team catalogued the tombs, measured and drew their architecture, copied inscriptions and paintings, and prepared the publication of the rock-cut tombs in the upper cemetery.

George Willoughby Fraser prepared plans, sections and measurements, while Newberry coordinated the archaeological descriptions and the reproduction of texts and scenes. In 1891, the seventeen-year-old Howard Carter joined the team and in 1892–1893 worked as a draughtsman copying tomb decoration at Beni Hasan and Deir El Bersha, alongside Marcus Worsley Blackden, Percy Brown and Percy Buckman.

The Egypt Exploration Fund published the results in four parts. The first two, edited by Newberry and devoted to the tombs and inscriptions, appeared in 1893 and 1894. The third, published in 1896 under the editorship of Francis Llewellyn Griffith, comprised an index of hieroglyphic signs. The fourth, issued by Newberry in 1900, collected zoological details and other particulars derived from the facsimiles of the paintings.

=== Excavations by John Garstang ===
For the University of Liverpool, John Garstang conducted campaigns in the lower cemetery in 1902–1903 and 1903–1904. He excavated hundreds of shaft tombs and recorded 888 burials, which he described in a volume published in 1907. The excavated objects were subsequently distributed among numerous museums and institutions.

A Macquarie University project has traced material from Beni Hasan in 114 institutions and catalogued more than 2,000 objects, many of which still bear their tomb numbers. Using documentation in the Garstang Museum of Archaeology and the Garstang Archive at the University of Liverpool, the project reconnects dispersed objects with the graves from which they were removed.

=== Research since 2010 ===
In 2010, the Australian Centre for Egyptology at Macquarie University began a new research programme at Beni Hasan under the direction of Naguib Kanawati. It studies both decorated tombs and selected undecorated burials chosen for their architectural features. The programme prepares new surveys and publications from colour photography, line drawings, architectural plans and new copies of inscriptions and painted scenes.

The project has completed studies of the tombs of Khnumhotep II, Amenemhat, Baqet III, Khnumhotep I and Khety, as well as the burial apartment of Baqet II. It also included the full publication of two Old Kingdom rock cut tombs (481 (ipi) and 482 (Bebi)).

== See also ==
- Art of ancient Egypt
- Middle Kingdom of Egypt
- Speos Artemidos
- List of ancient Egyptian towns and cities

== Sources ==
- Billson, Björn Marc (2010). Two Aspects of Middle Kingdom Funerary Culture from Two Different Middle Egyptian Nomes (PDF) (MPhil thesis). University of Birmingham.
- Connor, Simon (2025). "Qaou el-Kebir : l'expression du pouvoir d'une famille de notables provinciaux et le culte des ancêtres au Moyen Empire" (PDF). Rivista del Museo Egizio (in French). 9. doi:10.29353/rime.2025.6460.
- Garstang, John (1907). The Burial Customs of Ancient Egypt as Illustrated by Tombs of the Middle Kingdom (PDF). London: Archibald Constable & Co.
- Griffith, Francis Llewellyn (1896). Beni Hasan. Part III. London: Egypt Exploration Fund. doi:10.11588/diglit.10362.
- Kamrin, Janice (2009). "The Aamu of Shu in the Tomb of Khnumhotep II at Beni Hassan". Journal of Ancient Egyptian Interconnections. 1 (3): 22–36.
- Kanawati, Naguib; Khalifa, Eman; Bommas, Martin (2021). "Governor Baqet II at Beni Hassan: Security in Death" (PDF). Egyptian Archaeology (59): 37–41. ISSN 0962-2837.
- Mourad, Anna-Latifa (2020). "Foreigners at Beni Hassan: Evidence from the Tomb of Khnumhotep I (No. 14)". Bulletin of the American Schools of Oriental Research. 384: 105–132. doi:10.1086/710528.
- Mourad, Anna-Latifa (2021). "The Tomb of Khnumhotep I at Beni Hassan" (PDF). The Database of Religious History: 1–20. doi:10.14288/1.0401718.
- Newberry, Percy E. (1893). Beni Hasan. Part I. London: Egypt Exploration Fund. doi:10.11588/diglit.10360.
- Newberry, Percy E. (1894). Beni Hasan. Part II. London: Egypt Exploration Fund. doi:10.11588/diglit.10361.
- Newberry, Percy E. (1900). Beni Hasan. Part IV: Zoological and Other Details from Facsimiles. London: Egypt Exploration Fund. doi:10.11588/diglit.10363.
