= Percy Newberry =

English egyptologist

Percy Edward Newberry
- Born: 23 April 1869; Islington, London, England
- Died: 7 August 1949 (aged 80); Godalming, Surrey, England
- Education: King's College School, King's College London
- Occupation: Egyptologist

Percy Edward Newberry OBE (23 April 1869 – 7 August 1949) was a British Egyptologist.

== Biography ==
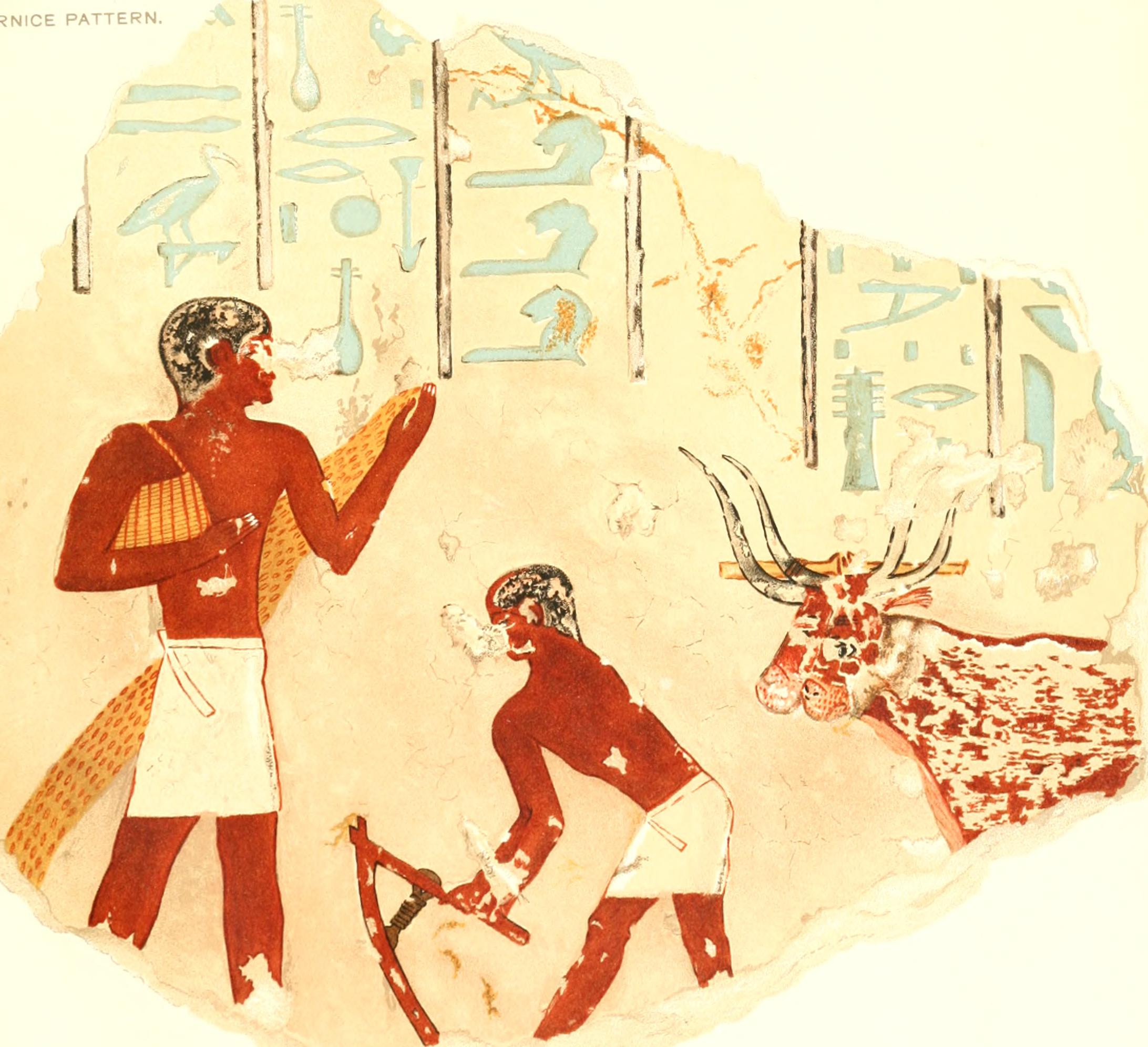
El Bersheh (1893) by Percy Newberry

Percy Newberry was born in Islington, London on 23 April 1869. His parents were Caroline (née Wyatt) and Henry James Newberry, a woollen warehouseman. Newberry developed a strong attachment to botany in childhood and was also an excellent artist. He studied at King's College School and King's College London, and studied botany at Kew Gardens.

=== Career ===
In 1884, on the invitation of Reginald Stuart Poole, Newberry began administrative work at the Egypt Exploration Fund, founded just two years previously. Here he met a number of established Egyptologists, including Flinders Petrie, Amelia Edwards and F. L. Griffith, who acted as his mentor. He continued in this role until 1886, when he began his own research in Egyptology, presenting a paper on botany in excavations to the British Association in 1888, with Petrie making use of Newberry's botanical expertise to identify botanical remains found during past excavations.

In 1890 Newberry travelled to Egypt with Howard Carter, whom Newberry had appointed as a trainee tracer, after recognising his talent as an artist. There they worked on the excavation of Beni Hasan and El-Bersheh, which Newberry led from 1890 to 1894, writing a two-volume monograph on Beni Hasan. From 1895 to 1905 he worked as a freelance excavator in the Theban necropolis, his patrons including Lord Amherst, the Marquess of Northampton, and Theodore M. Davis. In 1902 he joined the staff of the Catalogue Général of the Services des Antiquities of the Cairo Museum.

On the strength of his fieldwork and publications, Newberry was appointed the first Brunner Professor of Egyptology at the University of Liverpool, serving from 1906 to 1919. He was then an honorary Reader in Egyptian Art at Liverpool, (1919 to 1949), and was made a fellow of King's College, London, (1908 to 1949).

Newberry supported the Tutankhamun excavation team for several seasons, and was present on 12 February 1924 when the king's sarcophagus was opened. His speciality was the botanical specimens from the tomb, on which he would briefly report in the second volume of Carter's The Tomb of Tut.ankh.Amen, published in 1927.

In 1927–28 Newberry explored the Gabal Elba region of the Sudan, and was Professor of Ancient History and Archaeology at Cairo University from 1929 to 1933. He continued to work with the Egypt Exploration Society, helping to organise the Society's work at the pharaoh Akhenaten's capital at Amarna in the 1930s. He was elected the Society's vice-president shortly before his death. He received further honours, including President of the anthropology section of the British Association (1923) and vice-president of the Royal Anthropological Institute (1926). In 1920 he was appointed an Officer of the Order of the British Empire for his work with the Ministry of National Service during the First World War.

=== Personal life ===
On 12 February 1907 Newberry married Essie Winifred Johnston (1878–1953). They had no children. He died on 7 August 1949 at his home in Godalming in Surrey aged 80.

== Works ==
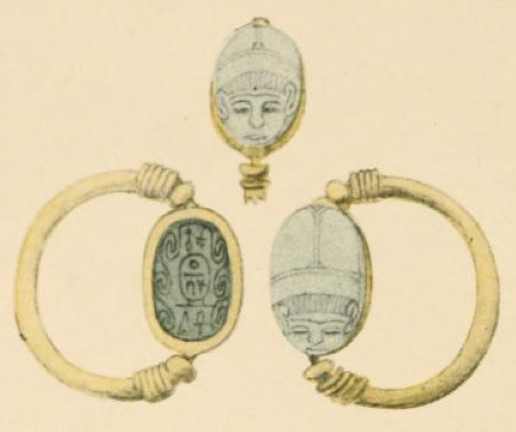
Scarabs: an introduction to the study of Egyptian seals and signet rings, by Percy Newberry

Newberry wrote extensively on Egyptology, including reports on archaeological findings and numerous contributions to English, French, and German scientific journals. After his death, Newberry's widow presented his correspondence and manuscripts to the Griffith Institute at Oxford University. His publications include:

- Beni Hasan. London: Kegan Paul, Trench, Trübner & Co. 1893.
- El Bersheh. Archaeological survey of Egypt, 3rd memoir. London: Egypt Exploration Fund. 1895.
- The life of Rekhmara. Westminster: Archibald Constable. 1900.
- A short history of ancient Egypt. London: Archibald Constable. 1904. (with John Garstang)
- Scarabs: an introduction to the study of Egyptian seals and signet rings. London: Archibald Constable. 1906.
- Scarab-shaped seals. Catalogue général des antiquités égyptiennes du Musée du Caire, v. 32. London: A. Constable and Co. 1907.
- The Timins collection of ancient Egyptian scarabs and cylinder seals. London: Archibald Constable. 1907.
- 'Egypt as a Field of Anthropological Research' in British Association for the Advancement of Science, Report of the Ninety-first Meeting, Liverpool 1923 : Sectional Presidential Addresses, H (London: Murray, 1924).
- Egypt as a field for anthropological research. Washington. 1925.
- Funerary statuettes and model sarcophagi. Catalogue général des antiquités égyptiennes du Musée du Caire. Cairo (Le Caire): Institut français d'archéologie orientale. 1930.
