= Middle Egypt =

Section of land between Lower Egypt and Upper Egypt

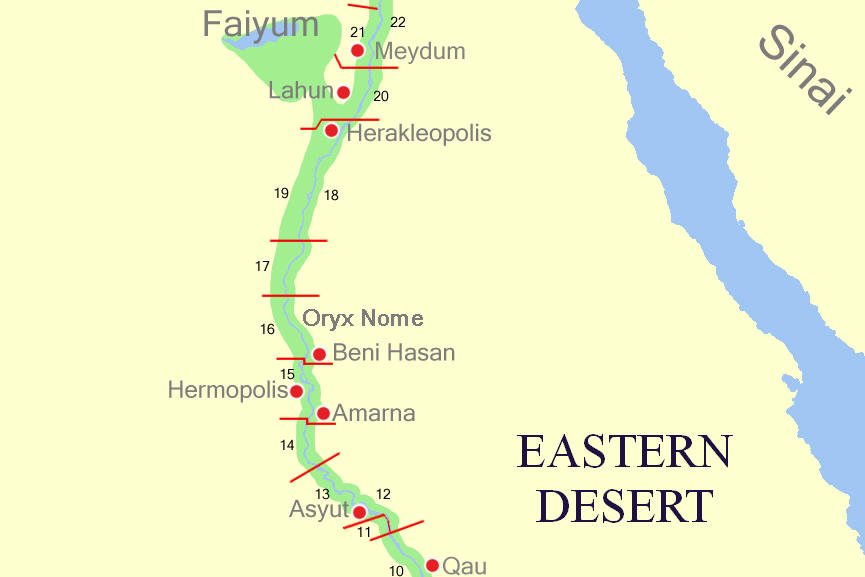
Nomes of Middle Egypt

Middle Egypt (Arabic: مِصْر ٱلْوِسْطَى, romanized: Miṣr al-Wisṭā) is the section of land between Lower Egypt (the Nile Delta) and Upper Egypt, stretching upstream from Asyut in the south to Memphis in the north. At the time, Ancient Egypt was divided into Lower and Upper Egypt, though Middle Egypt was technically a subdivision of Upper Egypt. It was not until the 19th century that archaeologists felt the need to divide Upper Egypt in two. As a result, they coined the term "Middle Egypt" for the stretch of river between Cairo and the Qena Bend. It was also associated with a region termed "Heptanomis" (/hɛpˈtænəmɪs/; Greek: ἡ Επτανομίς, in Ptol. iv. 5. § 55; more properly Ἑπτὰ Νομοί or Ἑπταπολίς, in Dionysius Periegetes 251; and sometimes ἡ μεταζύ[γή]; meaning "Seven Nomes", a "nome" being a subdivision of ancient Egypt), generally as the district which separates the Thebaïd from the Delta.

Middle Egypt today can be identified as the part of the Nile Valley that, while geographically part of Upper Egypt, is culturally closer to Lower Egypt. For instance, in terms of language, the Egyptian Arabic of people in Beni Suef and northwards shares features with Cairene and particularly rural Delta Arabic rather than with the Sa'idi Arabic spoken further south, and are often not considered Sa'idis.

== Heptanomis ==
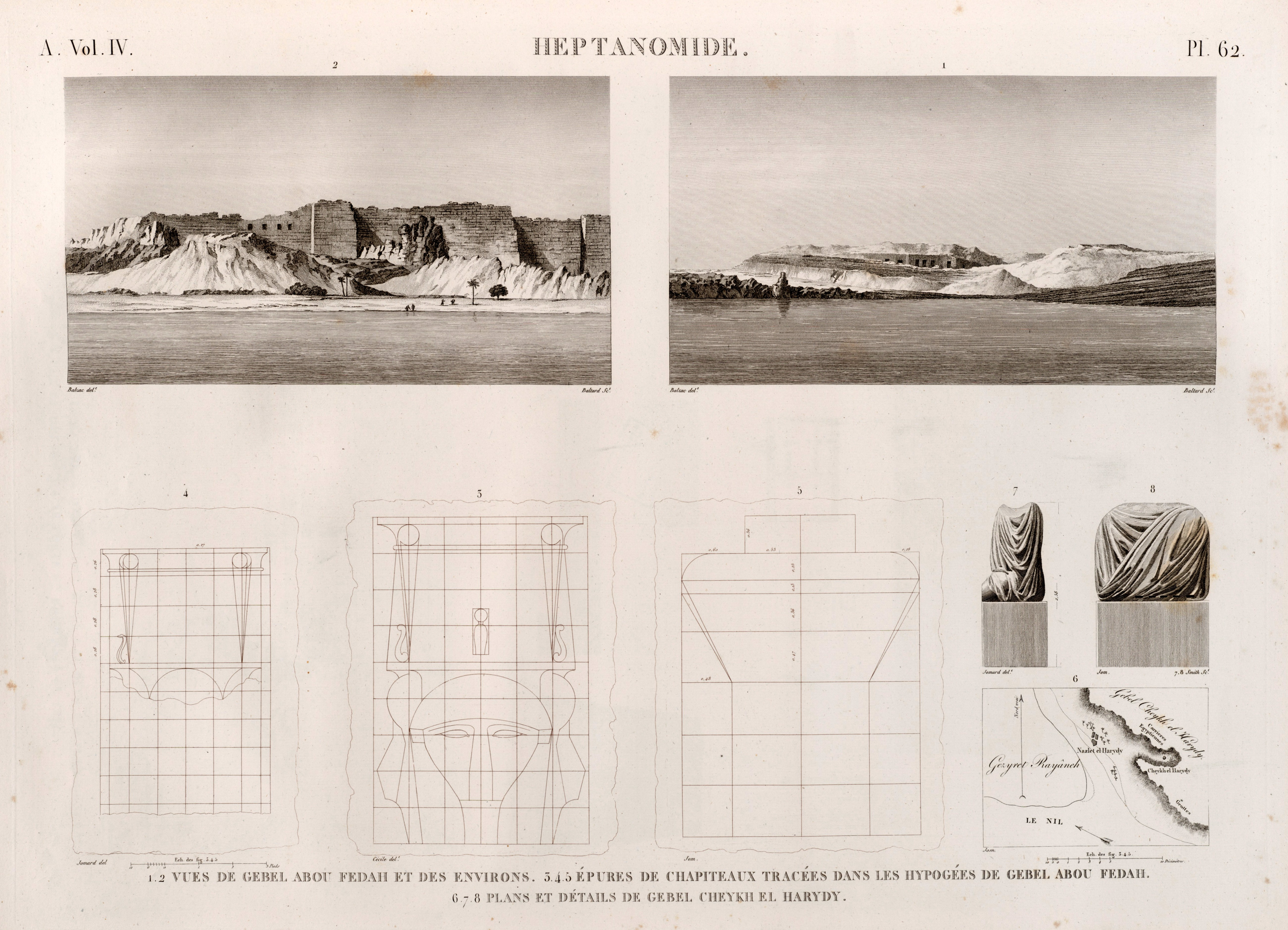
Heptanomide

In the 19th century, "Heptanomis" was described generally as the district which separates the Thebaïd from the Delta. In as much, however, as the appellation of the Seven Nomes is political rather than territorial, it is not easy to define the actual boundaries of this region. The northern portion belonged to the kingdom of Lower Egypt, of which it contained the capital, Memphis; the southern appertained to the elder kingdom of Thebes, so long at least as there continued to be two monarchies in the Nile valley. It is not possible to determine at what period, if indeed at any, the Heptanomis was regarded as an integral third of Egypt. About the number of its nomes there can be no question; but which, at any given era, were the seven principal nomes, it is less easy to decide. They probably varied with the vicissitudes of local prosperity, war, commerce, or migration, from time to time, causing a superior nome to decline, and, on the contrary, raising an inferior nome to eminence. According to Ptolemy and Agatharchides (De Rubr. Mar. ap. Photius Biblioth. p. 1339. R.), both of whom wrote long after the original divisions had been modified, the Seven Nomes were the following: (1) Memphites; (2) Heracleopolites; (3) Crocodilopolites, renamed Arsinoites; (4) Aphroditopolites; (5) Oxyrhynchites; (6) Cynopolites; and (7) Hermopolites. The Greater and Lesser Oases were always reckoned portions of the Heptanomis, and hence it must apparently have sent nine, and not seven, nomarchs to the general assembly in the Labyrinth. The capitals of the Nomes, whose names are sufficiently indicated by the respective appellations of the divisions themselves, e.g. Hermopolis of the Nomos Hermopolites, etc., were also the chief towns of the Middle Land. This district comprised the three greatest works of Egyptian art and enterprise, e. g., the Pyramids, the Labyrinth, and the artificial district formed by the canal Bahr Yusif (Canal of Joseph), the Nomos Arsinoites or the Fayyum (Fyoum). The Heptanomis extended from latitude 27°4′ North to 30° north; its boundary to south was the castle of Hermopolis (Ἐρμοπολιτάνη φυλακή), to the north the apex of the Delta and the town of Cercasorum, on the west the irregular line of the Libyan Desert, and on the east, the hills which confine the Nile, or the sinuous outline, the recesses and projections of the Arabian mountains. Thus, near Hermopolis at the southern extremity of this region, the eastern hills approach very near the river, while those on the western or left bank recede to a considerable distance from it. Again, in latitude 29° north, the Libyan hills retire from the vicinity of the Nile, bend toward northwest, and sharply return to it by a curve to east, embracing the province of Arsinoë (formerly Crocodilopolis, now the city of Al Fayyum). Between the hills on which the Pyramids stand and the corresponding elevation of Gebel-el-Mokattam on the eastern bank of the river, the Heptanomis expands, until near Cercasorum it acquires almost the breadth of the subjacent Delta. The Heptanomis is remarkable for its quarries of stone and its rock-grottoes. Besides the Alabastrites, to the north of Antinoë the grottoes of Beni Hasan, the Speos Artemidos of the Greeks is found. Nine miles lower down are the grottoes of Kom el-Ahmar, and in the Arabian Desert, on the east, quarries of the beautiful veined and white alabaster, which the Egyptians employed in their sarcophagi, and in the more delicate portions of their architecture. From the quarries of Tourah and Massarah, in the hills of Gebel-el-Mokattam, east of Memphis, they obtained the limestone used in casing the pyramids. The roads from these quarries may still be traced across the intervening plain. Under the Ptolemies, the Heptanomis was governed by an ἐπιστράτηγος (viceroy / prefect), and by an officer of corresponding designation, procurator, under the Roman Caesars. The procurator described in inscriptions (Orelli, Inscr. Lat. n. 516) was described as procurator Augusti epistrategiae Septem Nomorum. Under the later Caesars in the 3rd century, the five northern Nomes, Memphites, Heracleopolites, Arsinoites, Aphroditopolites, and Oxyrhyncites, together with the Nomos Leptopolites, constituted the province of Arcadia Ægypti, which subsequently became a metropolitan episcopal see. The natural productions of the Heptanomis resemble those of Upper Egypt generally, and present a more tropical fauna and flora than those of the Delta. Its population also was less modified by Greek or Nubian admixture than that of either Lower or Upper Egypt; although, after the 4th century, the Heptanomis was overrun by Arabian marauders, who considerably affected the native racial mix.

The capital cities of the Heptanomis were collectively called the "Heptapolis" (Ancient Greek: Ἑπταπολίς, meaning "Seven Cities"), and they were Memphis, Heracleopolis, Crocodilopolis (later Arsinoe), Aphroditopolis, Oxyrhynchos, Cynopolis and Hermopolis.

== Major cities ==
- 6th of October (city)
- Beni Suef
- Minya, Egypt
- Giza
- Faiyum

== See also ==
- Upper and Lower Egypt
- Geography of Egypt
