= Pepyankh the Black =

Ancient Egyptian official (fl. c. 2200 BC)

- Vizier of Egypt
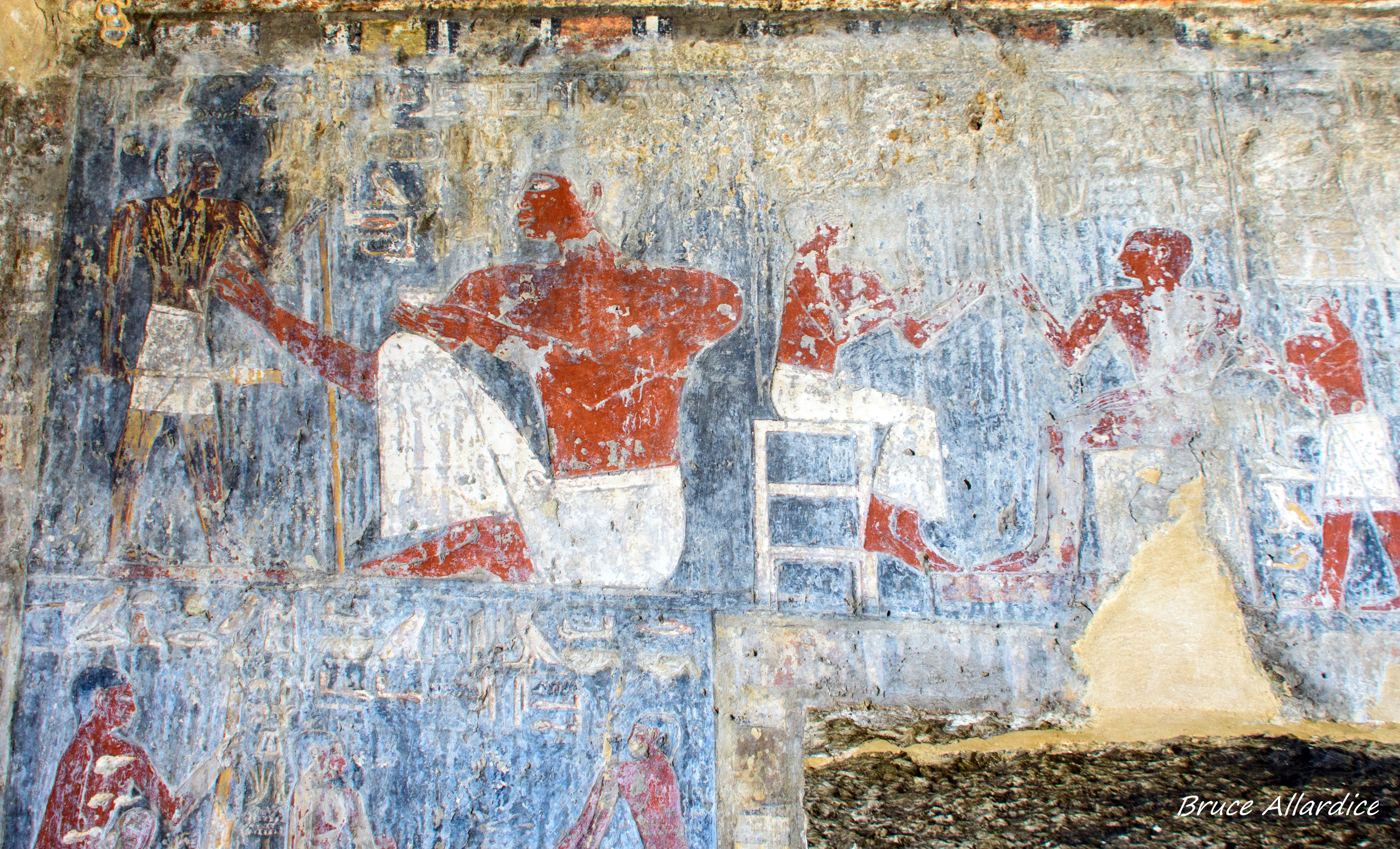
- Tomb Relief of Pepyankh the Black
- Tenure: c. 2200 BC
- Burial: Asyut, Egypt
- Spouse: Zetnetpepy
- Father: Niankh-Pepy-kem

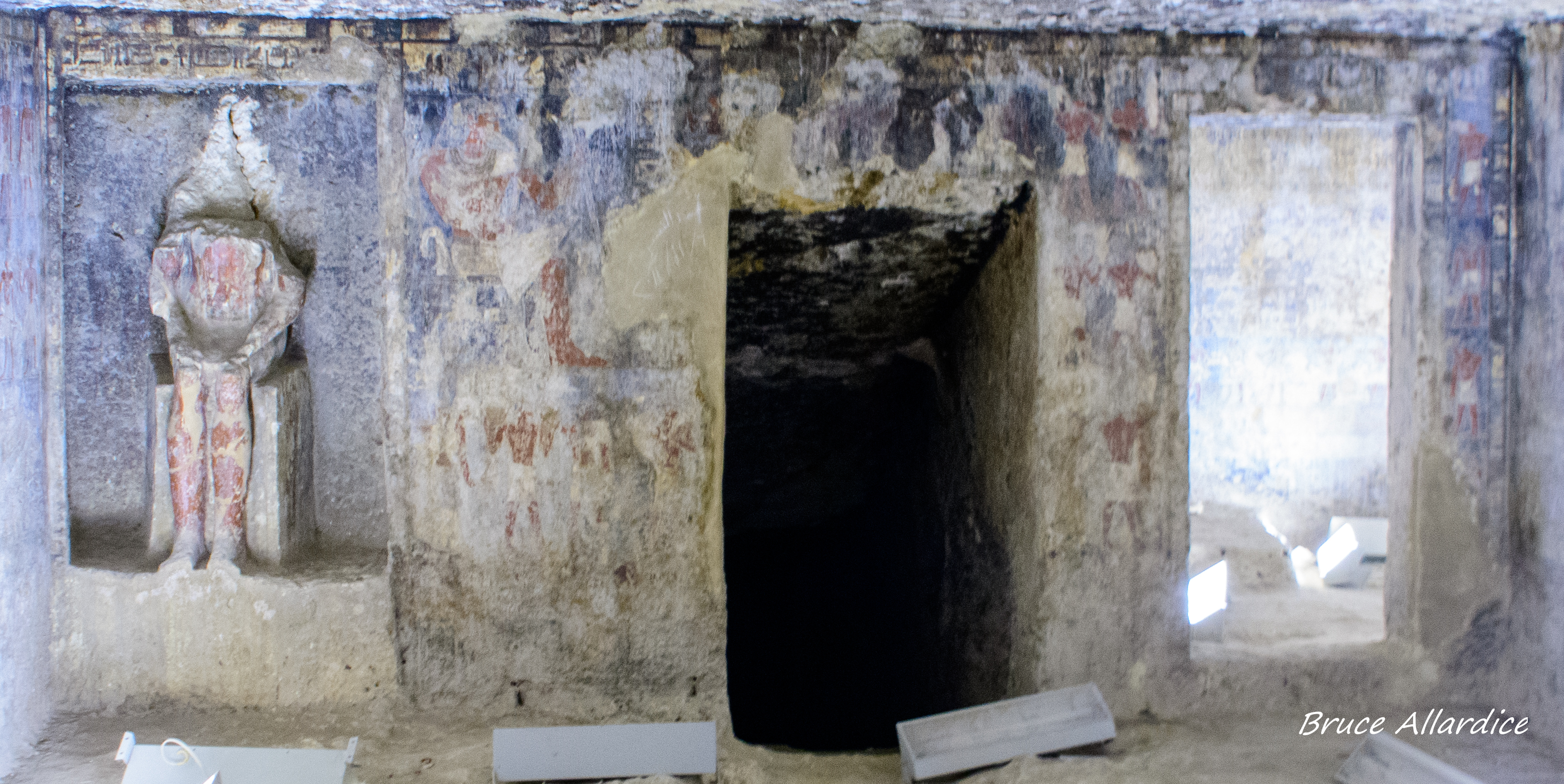
An interior view of Pepyankh the Black’s tomb at Meir, Middle Egypt

Pepyankh the Black (Ancient Egyptian: Niankh-Pepy kem; fl. c. 2200 BC) was an ancient Egyptian official who is known from his monumental and decorated rock-cut tomb at Meir in Middle Egypt. He lived at the end of the 6th Dynasty.

Pepyankh the Middle was a member of a family which held important positions over several generations in the fourteenth Nome of Upper Egypt. He is attested in his tomb with a high number of variations of his names: Pepyankh and Heny as well as Pepyankh the Black or Heny the black. The name Heny is written in many variations in particular. Pepyankh's father was Niankh-Pepy-kem, also holding key positions in the fourteenth Nome. His wife was called Zetnetpepy and several of his children are known.

24 administrative, religious, and ranking titles are documented in his tomb for Pepyankh the Middle. Most importantly, he was the vizier. This was the highest position at the royal court in Ancient Egypt, just below the king. Other important titles were Haty-a, royal sealer, and sole friend. He was also overseer of priests, overseer of the double granary, Overseer of the treasuries, and overseer of Upper Egypt.

The tomb of Pepyankh the Black is cut into the rock. There is a decorated chapel and there are burial chambers reached by shafts. The chapel is fully decorated with painted reliefs. They show Pepyankh the Black and workmen. Remarkable an are several scenes showing funerary rituals. The chapel has also a serdab. This is a room for statues of the tomb owner and his family members. Serdabs are normally not decorated, but in this case statues of Pepyankh the Black are shown on all three walls (the fourth wall is the entrance).

The tomb was first fully recorded and published by Aylward Blackman. Later an Australian team under Naguib Kanawati recorded, photographed, and published the tomb again in 2014.

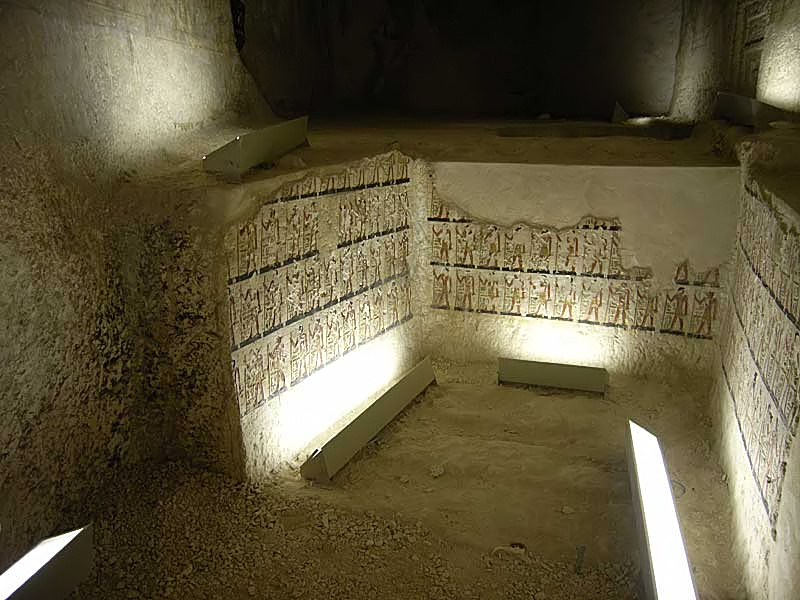
Serdab in the tomb of Pepyankh the Black

== Bibliography ==
- Naguib Kanawati and Linda Evans (2014): The cemetery of Meir Volume II: The tomb of Pepyankh the Black. With contributions by E. Alexakis, A.L. McFarlane. A.L. Mourad, S. Shafik, A. Suleiman, B. Thompson andN. Victor (= Australian Centre for Egyptology: Reports. vol. 34). Aris & Phillips, Oxford, ISBN 978-0-85668-841-6.
- Aylward M. Blackman; F.L.Griffith (1928): The Rock Tombs of Meir Part V, London, 16–36, plates XV-XLIII online
