= Ukhhotep III =

Ancient Egyptian official

- Nomarch of the 14th nome of Upper Egypt
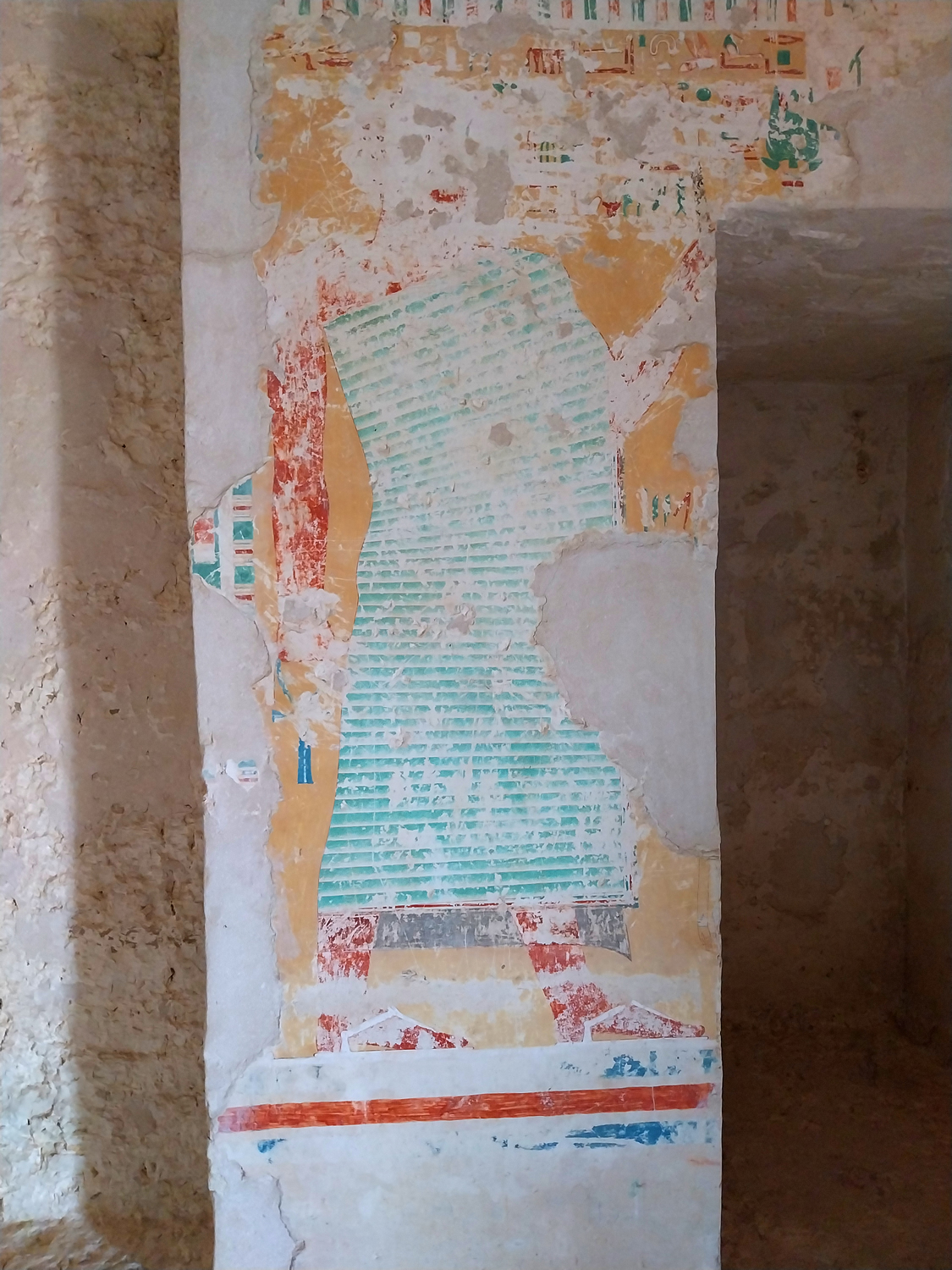
- Figure of Ukhhotep III in his tomb
- Dynasty: 12th Dynasty
- Burial: Meir tomb C1
- Spouse: It, Pepy, Nebkau and Khnumhotep
- Father: Ukhhotep
- Mother: Heny-hery

Ukhhotep III (Ukh is satisfied) was an Ancient Egyptian of the Twelfth Dynasty who was a local governor at Cusae. He is mainly known from his decorated tomb chapel at Meir.

The inscriptions in his tomb chapel provide information on his person. His father was a certain Ukhhotep. As mother a woman with the name Heny-hery (Heny-the middle) is mentioned. A high number of women are named in the tomb decoration but their relation to Ukhhotep is not always clear. Four of them are called his wifeː It, Pepy, Nebkau, Khnumhotep

Ukhhotep bears several titles. He was overseer of priests of Hathor, lady of the two lands, royal sealer, sole friend and mayor.

Seventeen women around Ukhhotep III are known. Their relation to him is not always clearː

- It, his wife
- Ankhu
- Pepi second wife
- Mereret, daughter
- Nebkau, born of Iunu, wife
- Nebmehyt
- Neferum daughter
- Henu
- Hetep
- Hetepaat, living one
- Khenmytwer
- Khnumhotep,his wife
- Khnum...
- ...waret
- Khekeretnetsemerkhet
- name lost
- ...ib

His tomb chapel (Meir tomb C1) consists of an open courtyard, a chapel that is decorated with paintings and an inner chapel that is decorated with paintings too. Two statues showing Ukhhotep and wives come from this tomb and are now in the Egyptian Museum, Cairo and in the Museum of Fine Arts, Boston.

The tomb was first fully published by Aylward Manley Blackman in 1953, who recorded all tomb scenes in drawings. A second publication appeared in 2022 by Naguib Kanawati, Georgia Barker.

== Literature ==
- Aylward M. Blackman, Michael R. Apted (1953): The rock tombs of Meir. Part VI: The tomb-chapels of Ukhḥotpe son of Iam (A, No. 3), Senbi son of Ukhḥotpe son of Senbi (B, No. 3), and Ukhḥotpe son of Ukhḥotpe and Ḥeny-Ḥery-Ib (C, No. 1). (= Archaeological Survey of Egypt. Twenty-Ninth Memoir). Egypt Exploration Society, London (Online via the Internet Archive).
- Naguib Kanawati, Georgia Barker (2022): The cemetery of Meir. Band V: The tomb of Wekhhotep III. With contributions by L. Donovan, S. Shafik, A. Suleiman and N. Victor (= Australian Centre for Egyptology: Reports. Band 45). Abercromby Press, Wallasey 2022, ISBN 978-1-912246-12-0.
