= Ukhhotep II =

Ancient Egyptian official

- Nomarch of the 14th nome of Upper Egypt
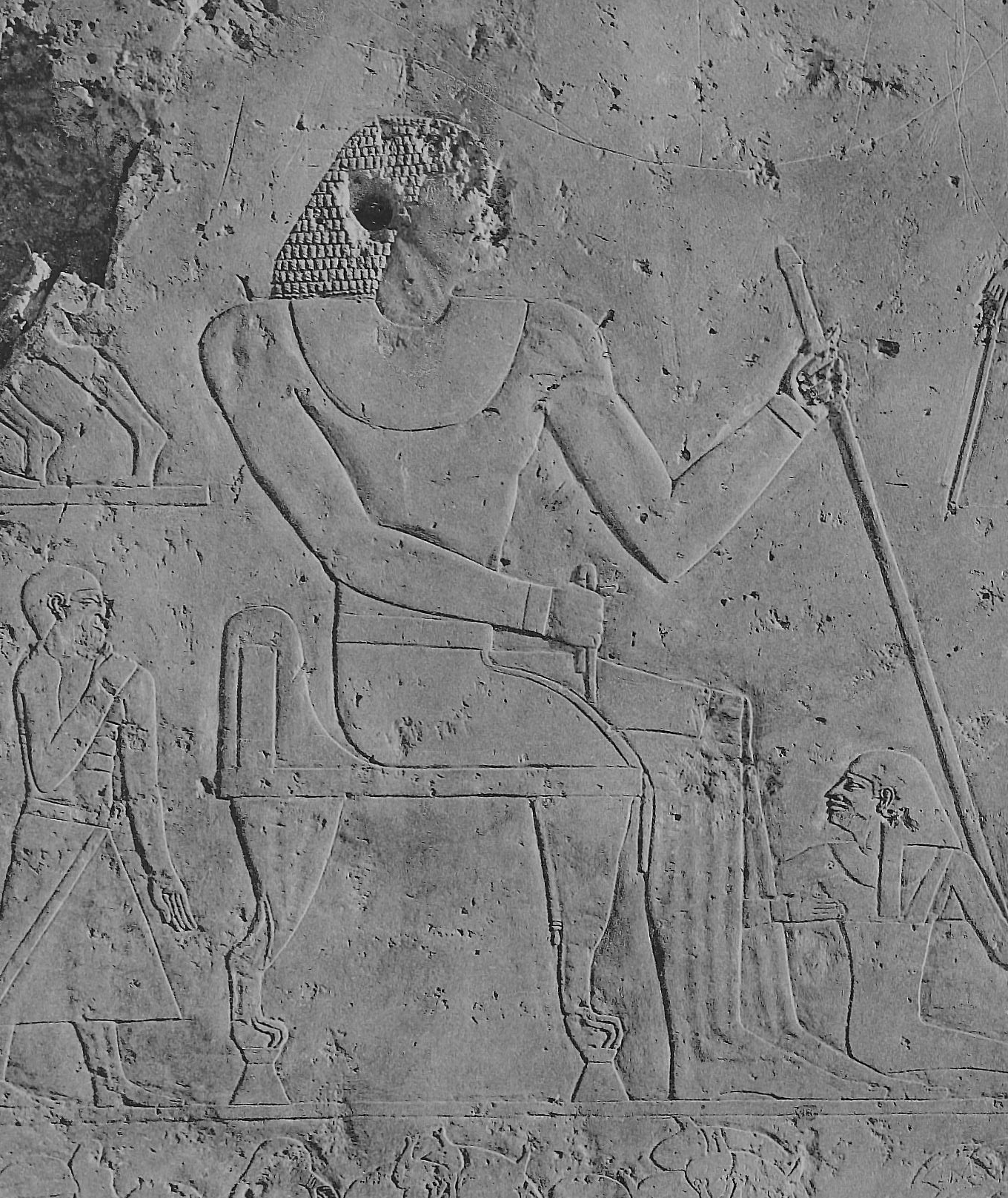
- Ukhhotep II from his tomb
- Predecessor: Senebi I
- Successor: Senebi II
- Dynasty: 12th Dynasty
- Pharaoh: Senusret I
- Burial: Meir, tomb B2
- Spouse: Djehutyhotep
- Father: Senebi I
- Mother: Mersi (sꜣt ḥꜣtj-ꜥ mr(⸗j)-sj)
- Children: Senebi II, Mersi

Ukhhotep II (wḫ-ḥtp; also Wekhhotep) was an ancient Egyptian official during the reign of pharaoh Senusret I of the 12th Dynasty.

== Biography ==
Ukhhotep II was a nomarch of the 14th nome of Upper Egypt, headquartered in Cusae. He also held several charges such as haty-a, iry-pat, royal sealer, chief lector priest, overseer of the priests of Hathor, sem-priest, true king's acquaintance and many others.

His father was the nomarch Senebi I while his mother was a lady called Mersi. His wife was Djehutyhotep, and the couple had at least two children to whom the same name of Ukhhotep's parents were given: Senebi II and Mersi.

== Tomb B2 ==
Ukhhotep II is mainly known because of his tomb (B2), located in the necropolis of Meir, which was excavated in the early 20th century by British Egyptologist Aylward M. Blackman; an excavation report was published in 1915.

Inside of the tomb, along the West and South walls there are many inscriptions dedicated to Osiris and Horus. The tomb is separated from that of Ukhhotep's father Senebi I (B1) only by a thin partition-wall. The tomb stands from floor to ceiling at 270 cm with a small undecorated doorway leading to the burial chamber. Within the tomb are walls of reliefs depicting various events and displays of everyday life in the city of Cusae. Examples of images include boat-building, papyrus harvesting, war, Ukhhotep sitting with his wife, offerings, etc.

The tomb has been remarked because of a certain grade of realism of its reliefs: among the depictions, there are several herdsmen in evident state of starvation, a man who has fallen under the load on his back, and blind harpers. However, many figures are just crudely cut into the walls, thereby revealing a somewhat poor technique: according to Blackman's description, the reliefs have an “unintentional roughness [that] seems rather to add to the spirit of vigor and strenuous activity with which the sculptor has imbued many of his representations of the toiling…”. Few reliefs were interrupted at an early stage and the drawing grid is still visible.

== Bibliography ==
- Blackman, A.M. (1915). The rock tombs of Meir: Part II: The tomb-chapel of Senbi's son Ukh-Hotp: (B, no. 2). London: Egypt Exploration Society.
- Grajetzki, Wolfram (2006). The Middle Kingdom of ancient Egypt: history, archaeology and society. London: Duckworth Egyptology. ISBN 9780715634356.
