= Pepyankh the Middle =

Ancient Egyptian vizier (fl. c. 2200 BC)

Pepyankh
- Vizier of Egypt
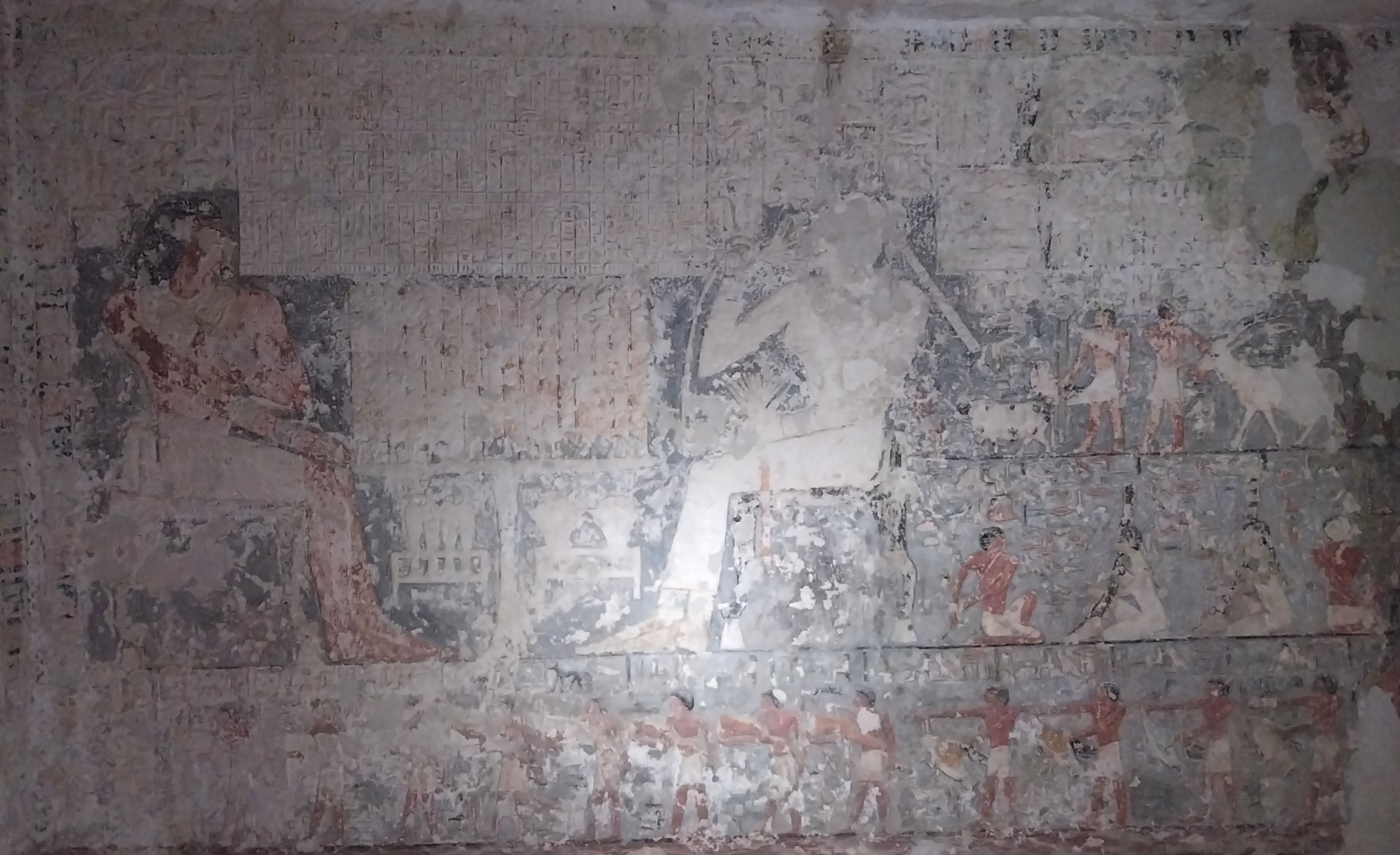
- Pepyankh the Middle and his wife Hutiah
- Tenure: c. 2200 BC
- Burial: Meir, Egypt
- Spouse: Hutiah
- Mother: Bebi
- Children: Niankh-Pepy-kem; Wekh-henen; Pepyankh/Neferkai; Pepyankh/Hepi-djeser; Khuienwekh

Pepyankh the Middle (Ancient Egyptian: Niankh-Pepy hry-ib; fl. c. 2200 BC) was an important ancient Egyptian vizier who is known from his monumental and decorated rock-cut tomb at Meir in Middle Egypt. He lived around the end of the 6th Dynasty.

Pepyankh the Middle was a member of an important family that held important positions over several generations in the fourteenth Nome of Upper Egypt. Four different names are attested for himː Pepyankh the Middle, Meryre-ankh the Middle, Neferka, and Heny the Middle. As father is attested Hepi who was also called Sobekhotep. His mother was a woman called Bebi also called Pekhernefret. Several sons are depicted in his tombs. Niankh-Pepy-kem is also known from an important tomb and held many important positions in the province too. Other sons are Wekh-henen, Pepyankh/Neferkai, Pepyankh/Hepi-djeser, and Khuienwekh. The wife of Pepyankh the Middle was a woman called Hutiah with the second name Huti.

Pepyankh the Middle is known primarily from his tomb at Meir. He held many important titles, but was above all a vizier and, in practice, the Overseer of Upper Egypt. In addition to these significant, high-ranking state offices, Pepyankh held numerous other positions, though he does not appear to have been a local prince. He also served as Overseer of the Priests of Hathor, Mistress of Qusai—the town where he likely resided.

Pepyankh the Middle’s wife was a woman named Hutiah, also known as Huti. She held the titles "Royal Acquaintance," "Noblewoman," "Priestess of Hathor, Mistress of Qusai," and "Sistrum Player of Hathor, Mistress of Qusai." Her mother was named Neferirues (or Fefi).

44 administrative religious and ranking titles are documented the tomb for Pepyankh the Middle. Most importantly he was vizier. This was the highest position at the royal court in Ancient Egypt, just under the king. Other important titles were Iry-pat, Haty-a, royal sealer, and sole friend. He was also overseer of priests of Hathor, and the overseer of the double granary.

His tomb consists of a decorated chapel cut into the rocks and shafts going down to burial chambers. The chapel is decorated with painted reliefs. The scenes show Pepyankh the Middle and his wife before offering tables, but also Pepyankh alone or him and his wife before farmers and craftsmen who are preparing food and are at work. Pepyankh's burial chamber is painted and shows items and objects important for the afterlife.

The tomb was first fully recorded in 1921 and published in 1924 by Aylward Blackman. Later an Australian team under Naguib Kanawati recorded, photographed, and published the tomb again in 2012.

== Bibliography ==
- Naguib Kanawati (2012): The cemetery of Meir Volume I: The tomb of Pepyankh the Middle the Black. With contributions by E. Alexakis, A.L. Mourad, S. Shafik, N. Victor and A. Woods (= Australian Centre for Egyptology: Reports. vol. 31). Aris & Phillips, Oxford, ISBN 978-0856688454.
- Aylward M. Blackman; F.L.Griffith (1924)ː The Rock Tombs of Meir Part IV The Tomb Chapel of Pepi'onkh the Middle Son of Sebkhotpe and Pekhernefert, London online
