= Baqet I =

Nomarch

- Nomarch of the 16th nome of Upper Egypt
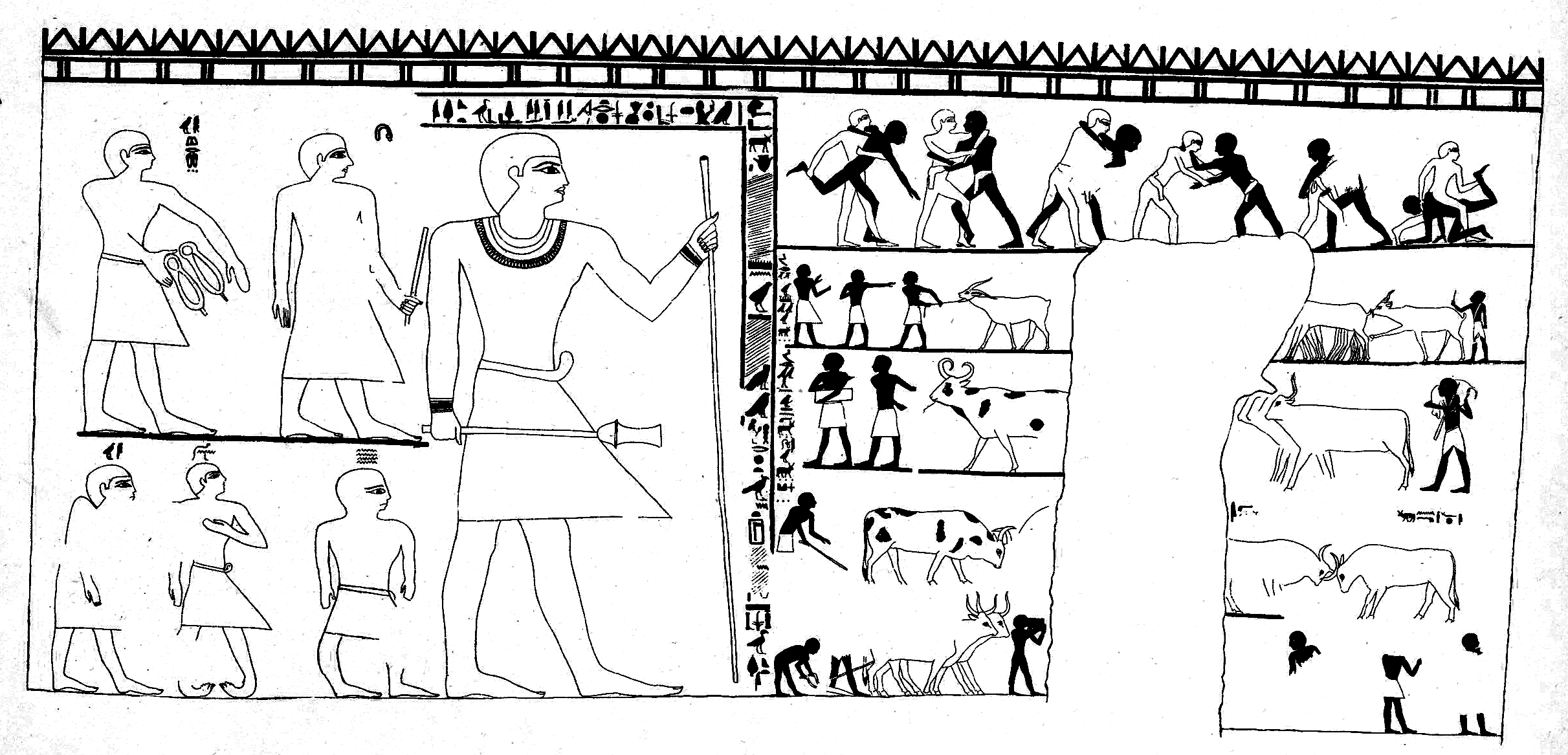
- Wall scene in his tomb chapel, showing Baqet
- Successor: Baqet II
- Dynasty: 11th Dynasty
- Burial: Beni Hasan tomb 29 (BH29)
- Spouse: Djehutyqai
- Children: Baqet II

Baqet I was an Ancient Egyptian local governor in the Oryx nome dating to the early Middle Kingdom (11th Dynasty) who is mainly known from his tomb chapel at Beni Hasan (BH 29). Little is known about his person. His wife was called Djehutyqai. One son is attested who was also called Baqet and who became successor as governor in the Oryx nome and is known as Baqet II. In the tomb decoration appear texts with titles of Baqet I. Most importantly he was Great overlord of the Oryx nome, but also Haty-a, Royal sealer and sole friend. He is depicted hunting in the marshes. On one wall wrestlers are shown. On another wall appears an offering list.

== Literature ==
- Percy Newberry, Beni Hasan. (1893) Part II. London, England: Kegan Paul, Trench, Tubner & Co., Ltd., po. 32–36, plates XXVII-XXXII Available online.
- Naguib Kanawati and Gemma Green (2026): Beni Hassan. Volume VIII: The tombs of Baqet I and Baqet II. With contributions by L. Donovan, K. McCorquodale, S. Shafik, A. Suleiman and N. Victor. Australian Centre for Egyptology: Reports 49. Wallasey: Abercromby Press, ISBN 9781912246380
