= Niankh-Pepy-kem =

Ancient Egpytian nobleman

- Royal sealer, Overseer of Upper Egypt
Egyptian name
< Q3 Q3 M17 M17 > S34 N35 Aa1 km
- Tenure: c. 2200 BC
- Burial: Asyut, Egypt
- Father: Pepyankh
- Children: Pepy-ankh

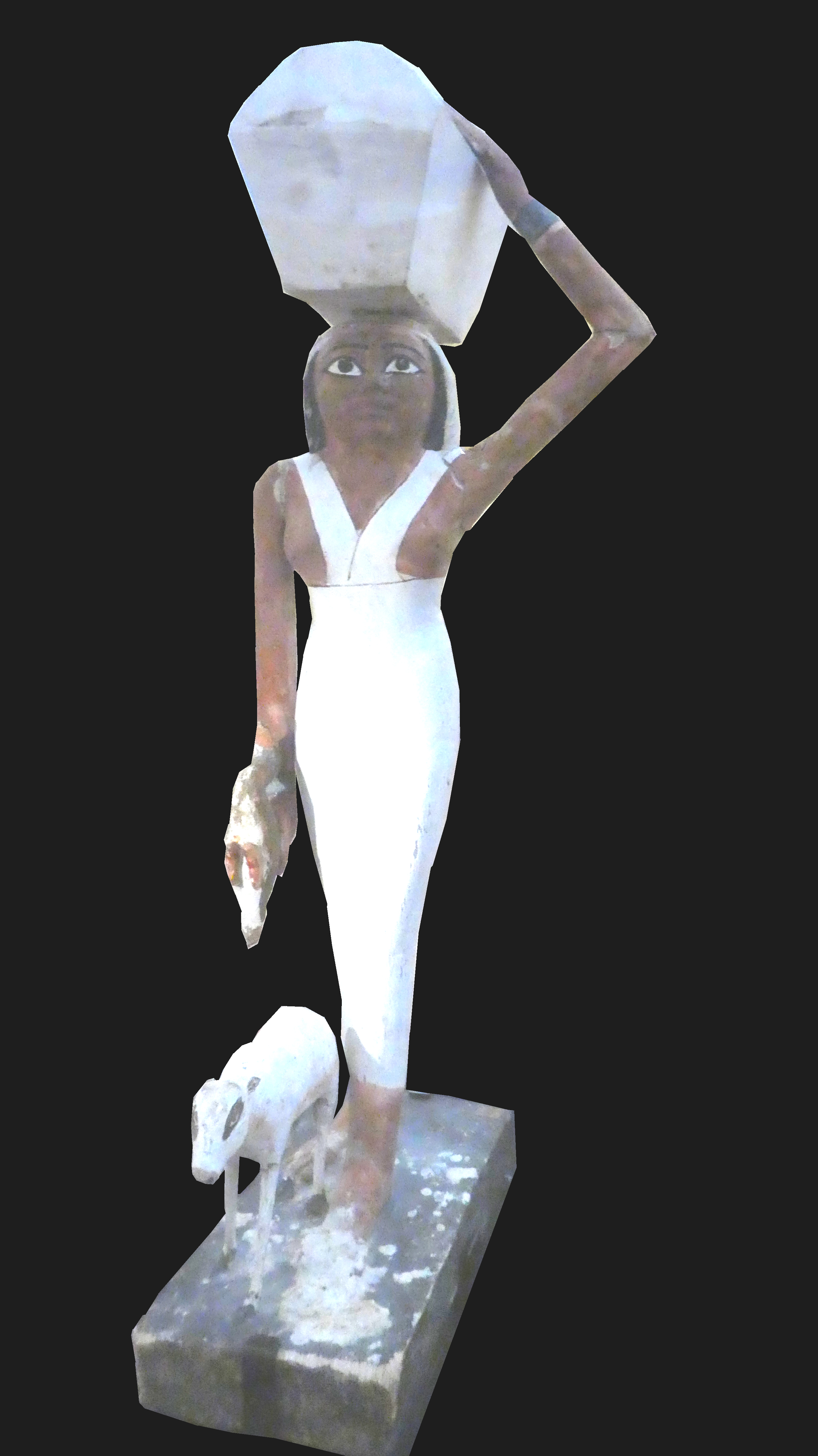
Servant figure from the tomb of Niankh-Pepy-kem

Niankh-Pepy-kem (Ancient Egyptian: Niankh-Pepy the Black; fl. c. 2200 BC) was an important ancient Egyptian official who is known from his monumental and decorated rock-cut tomb at Meir in Middle Egypt. He lived around the end of the 6th Dynasty.

Niankh-Pepy-kem is known to have had several important titles. He was royal sealer, sole friend, and count (haty-a), as well as overseer of Upper Egypt.

Niankh-Pepy-kem had several names. He was also called Niankh-Meryre-kem, Hepi-kem (Hepi the black) and Sobekhotep. Niankh-Pepy-kem was born into an influential local family. His father was Pepyankh-heri-ib (Pepyankh, the middle), in whose tomb Niankh-Pepy-kem is also depicted. The addition of kem (the black) to his name was most likely to distinguish Niankh-Pepy-kem from his father, who was also called Niankh-Pepy, and from his brother, also called Niankh-Pepy, but with the second name Hepi-djeser (hepi, the red).

Niankh-Pepy-kem is mainly known from his tomb (A1) at Meir. The monument consists of decorated chapels and shafts leading down to burial chambers. The decoration of the chapel is painted and at some places sunken reliefs are carved into the rocks. The depictions most often show Niankh-Pepy-kem, sometimes standing alone and sometimes in front of an offering table and offering bearers bring food to secure his eternal food supply.

The tomb was first fully recorded and published by Aylward Blackman. Later an Australian team under Naguib Kanawati recorded, photographed and published the tomb again in 2015.

== Bibliography ==
- Naguib Kanawati, Linda Evans, Miral Lashien, Anna-Latifa Mourad, Ashraf Senussi (2015): The cemetery of Meir Volume III: The tomb of Niankhpepy the Black. With contributions by S. Shafik, A. Suleiman, N. Victor (= Australian Centre for Egyptology: Reports. vol. 38). Aris & Phillips, Oxford, ISBN 978-0-85668-856-0.
- Aylward M. Blackman, Michael R. Apted (1953): The rock tombs of Meir. Part V: the tomb-chapels A, No. 1 (that of Ni-'Ankh-Pepi the Black), A, No. 2 (that of Pepi'onkh with the „good name“ of Ḥeny the Black), A, No. 4 (that of Ḥepi the Black), D, No. 1 (that of Pepi), and E, Nos. 1–4 (those of Meniu, Nenki, Pepi'onkh and Tjetu). (= Archaeological Survey of Egypt. vol. 28). Egypt Exploration Society, London 1953, pp. 1–15, plates I–XIII, LI–LIII (online).
