= Senebi I =

Ancient Egyptian official

- Nomarch of the 14th nome of Upper Egypt
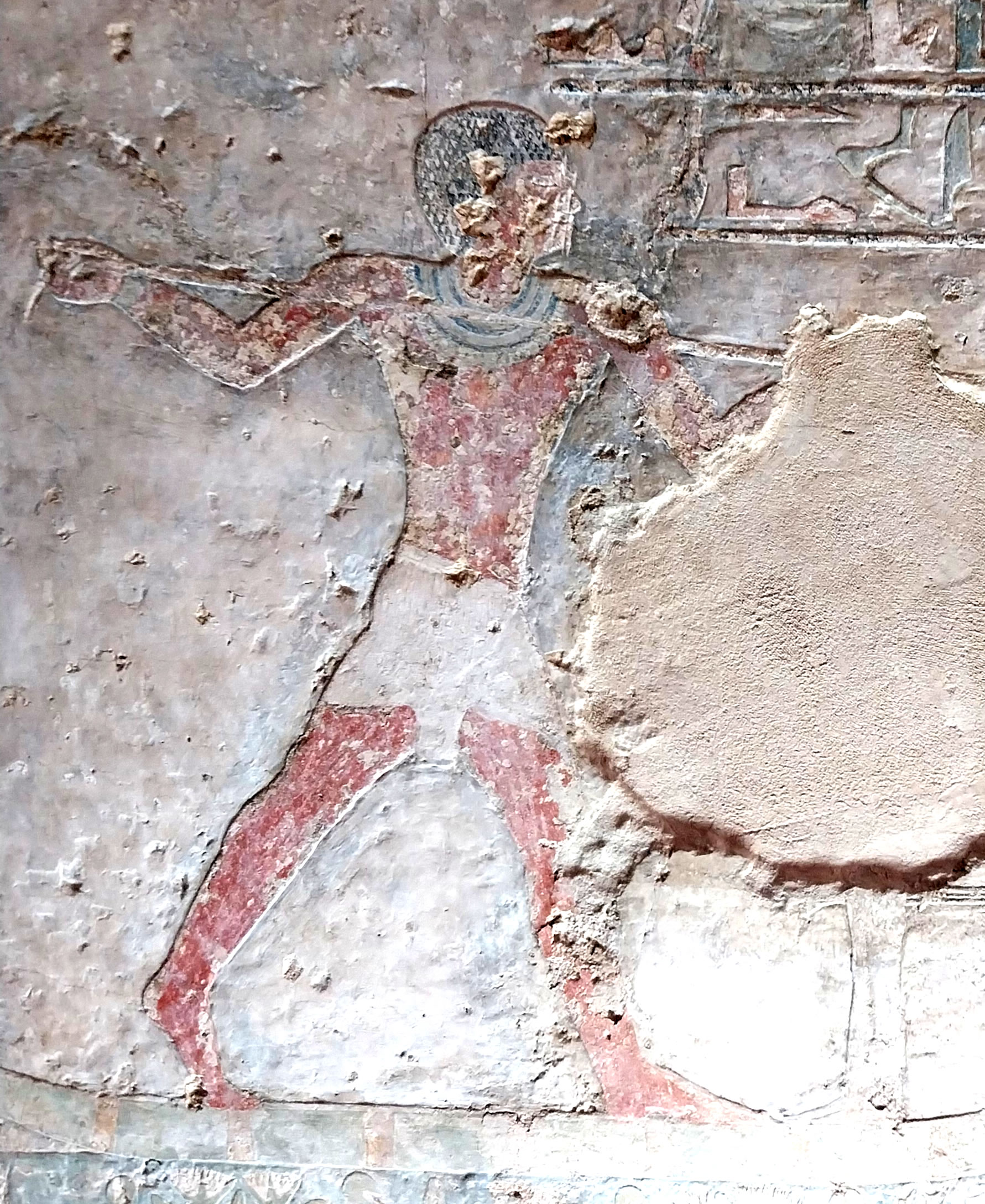
- Senebi hunting in the marhes
- Successor: Ukhhotep II
- Dynasty: 12th Dynasty
- Pharaoh: Senusret I
- Burial: Meir, tomb B1
- Spouse: Meres
- Father: Ukh-hotep
- Children: Ukh-hotep

Senebi was an ancient Egyptian governor of the 12th Dynasty in the 14th nome of Upper Egypt, headquartered in Cusae. He is mainly known from his tomb at Meir. He bears several titles and was overseer of priests, mayor.

Senebi is the first Middle Kingdom governor attested in the cemeteries of Meir. There is no king's name preserved in his tomb, so his date can be only calculated due to the dates of his successors and due the style of the decoration in his tomb. The reign of kings Amenemhat I or Senusret I seem to be most likely.

His tomb chapel consists of one room and is decorated with reliefs. They show daily life scenes, Senebi hunting in the desert and hunting in the marshes.

The tomb chapel was twice the target of a proper research project. At the beginning of the 20th century Aylward Manley Blackman recorded most decorated tomb chapels at Meir. It was again recorded in the 1990s by an Australian team under Naguib Kanawati.

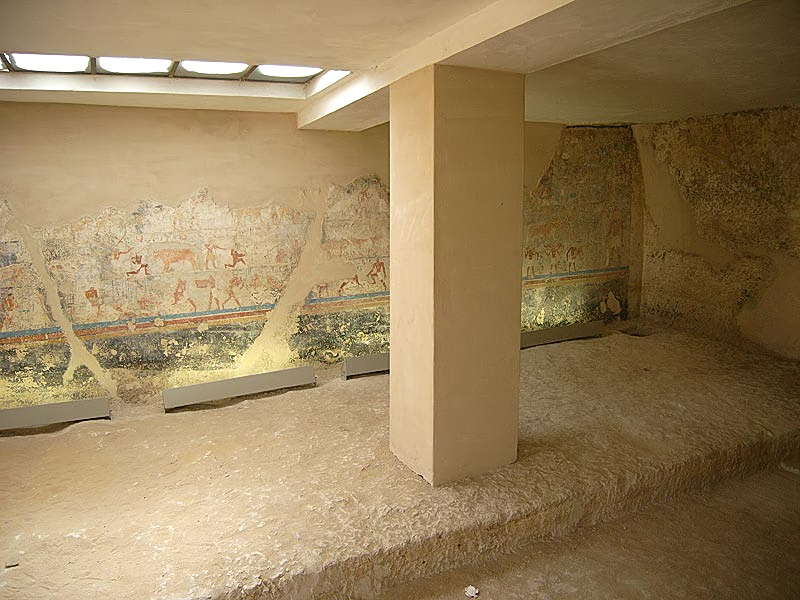
Tomb B1 of Senebi

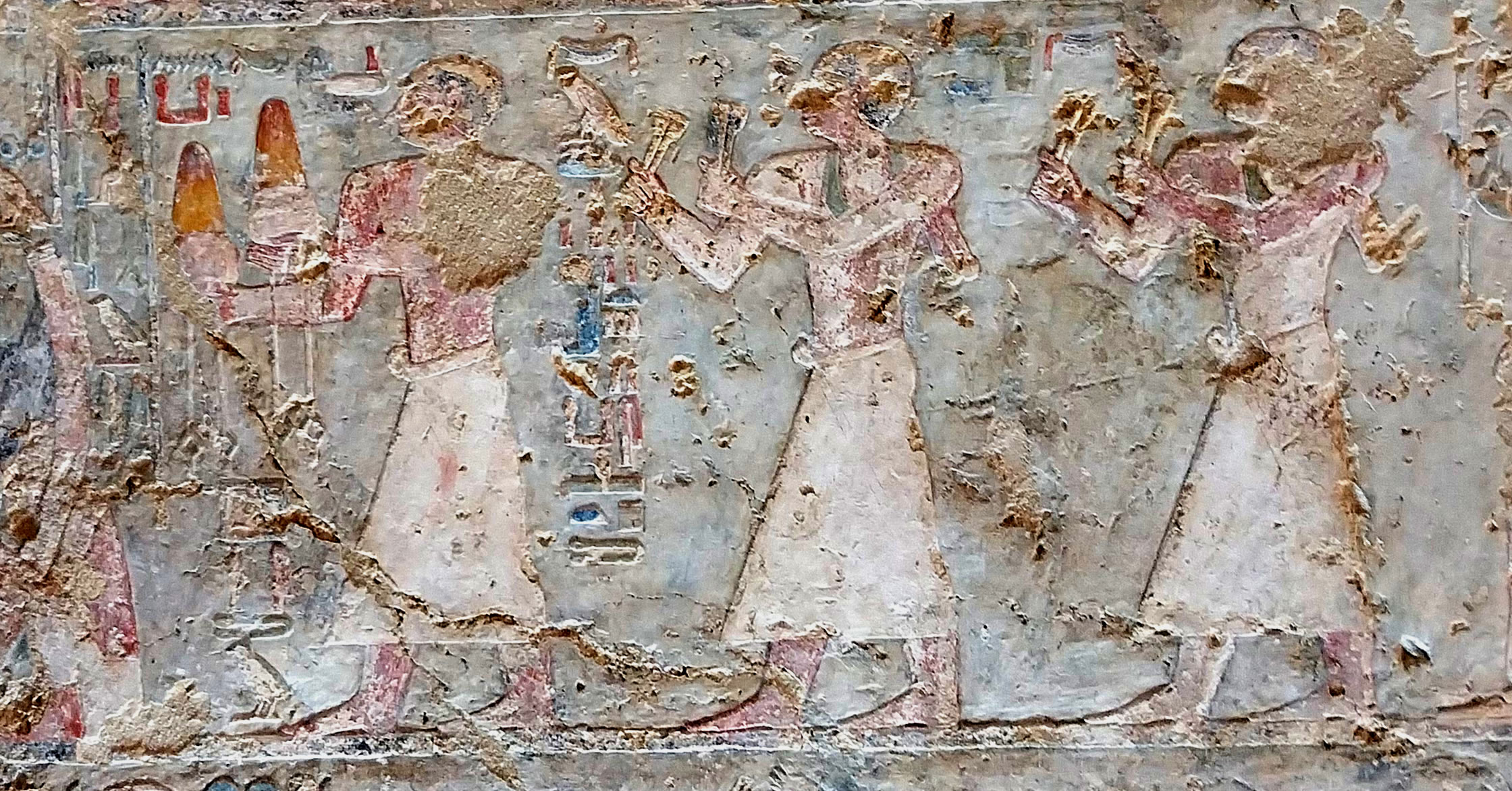
Tomb B1 of Senebi

== Literature ==
- Aylward Manley Blackman (2014): The rock tombs of Meir. Band 1: The tomb-chapel of Ukh-Hotp’s son Senbi (= Memoir / Archaeological Survey of Egypt. Band 22). Egypt Exploration Fund, London online.
- Kanawati, Naguib; Evans, Linda (2017). The cemetey of Meir, Volume IV, The Tomb of Senebi I and Wekhhotep I. Oxford: Aris and Philips Ltd. ISBN 978-0-85668-847-8.
