= Baqet II =

Nomarch

- Nomarch of the 16th nome of Upper Egypt
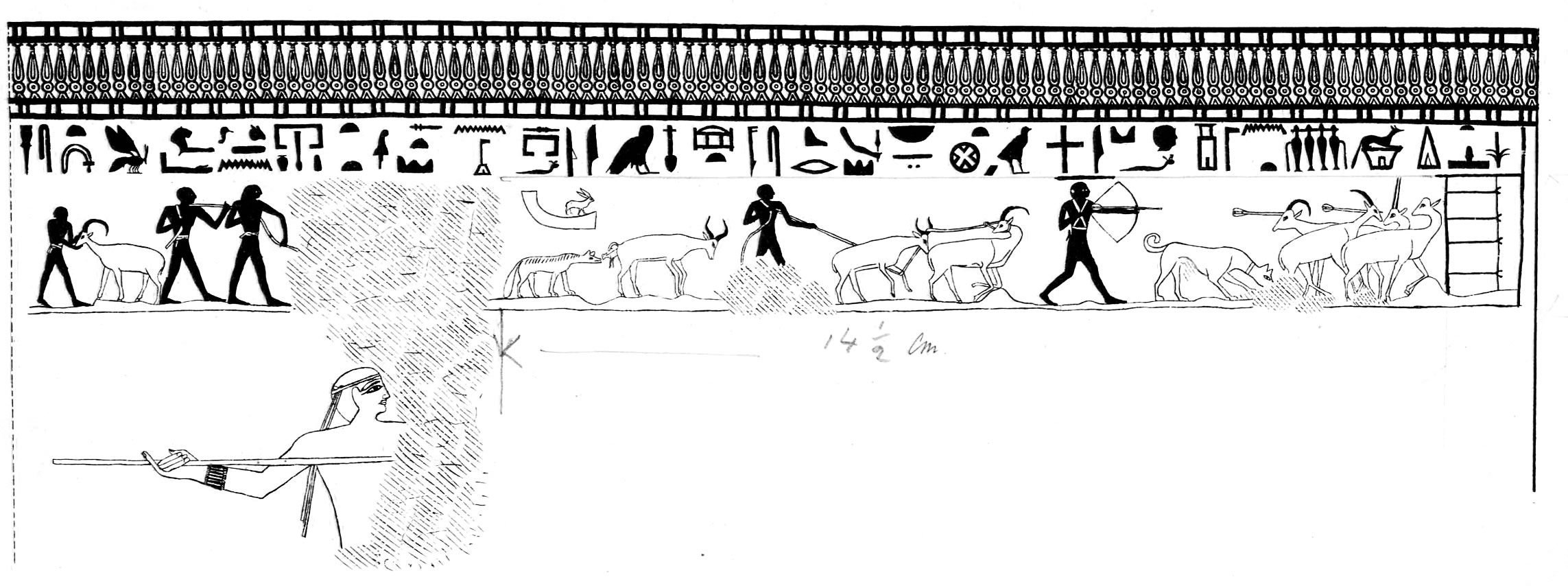
- Painting from Baqet's tomb chapel
- Predecessor: Baqet I
- Dynasty: 11th Dynasty
- Burial: Beni Hasan tomb 33 (BH33)
- Father: Baqet I
- Mother: Djehutyqai

Baqet II was an Ancient Egyptian local governor in the Oryx nome dating to the early Middle Kingdom (11th Dynasty) who is mainly known from his tomb chapel at Beni Hasan (BH 33). Little is known about his person. He was the son of Baqet I and his wife Djehutyqai. In the tomb decoration appear texts with titles of Baqet II. Most importantly he was Great overlord of the Oryx nome, but also Haty-a, Royal sealer and sole friend. His tomb consists of a rock cut chapel and underground burial chambers. The chapel is decorated with paintings, but they are not very well preserved, especially the paintings on the lower parts of the walls are mostly gone. The underground burial chambers were decorated with paintings too. Here was also found a skeleton of man around 25 to 35 years old, perhaps belonging to Baqet II.

== Literature ==
Percy Newberry, Beni Hasan. (1893) Part II. London, England: Kegan Paul, Trench, Tubner & Co., Ltd., pp. 37–40, plates XXXIV-XXXVI Available online.
