= Statue of official Bes =

Ancient Egyptian sculpture

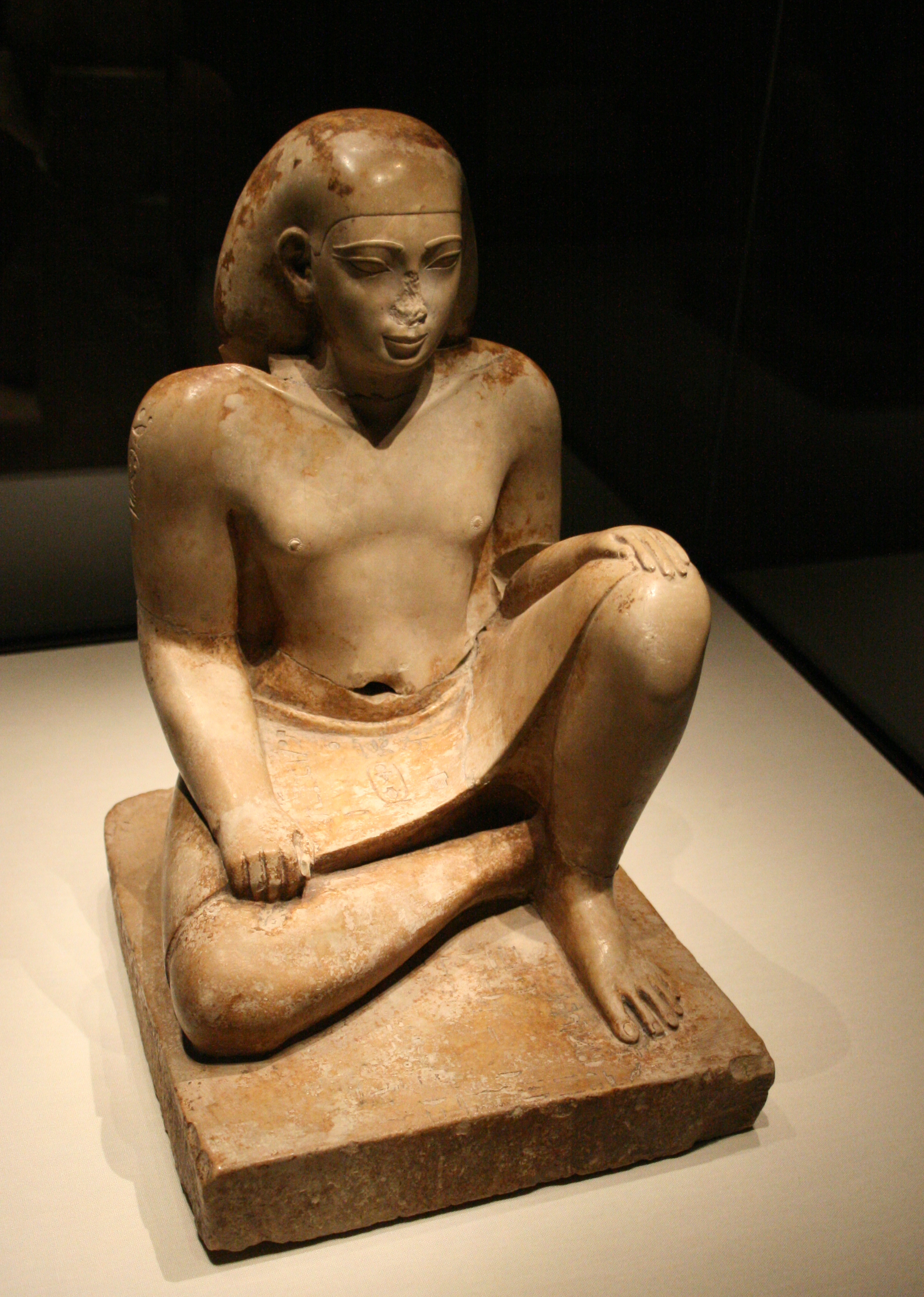
Official Bes from the 26th Dynasty of Egypt

The statue of official Bes is a statue of an ancient Egyptian courtier, currently housed in the Calouste Gulbenkian Museum in Lisbon. The height of the sculpture is 32.2 centimetres (12.7 in) while the width is 20.9 centimetres (8.2 in).

The statue depicts an elite courtier named Bes. The inscription at the statue's base describes him as “Count and Prince, Companion of His Majesty.” The statue dates to the reign of Psamtik I (664–610 BC) of the 26th Dynasty and depicts Bes in a pose typically used by government officials of that time period (it was also common during the Old Kingdom and beginning of the New Kingdom).
