= Winifred Blackman =

British egyptologist, archaeologist

Winifred Susan Blackman (1872–1950) was a pioneering British Egyptologist, archaeologist and anthropologist. She was one of the first women to take up anthropology as a profession.

== Family and education ==
Blackman was born in Norwich to Rev. James Henry Blackman and Mary Anne Blackman (née Jacob). She was one of five children, and her brother Aylward M. Blackman also became a noted Egyptologist. The Blackman family later moved to Oxford.

Blackman registered to study at the Pitt Rivers Museum from 1912 to 1915, taking the Diploma in Anthropology at the University of Oxford (Somerville College). She also worked as a volunteer on cataloguing collections at the Pitt Rivers Museum between 1912 and 1920, and donated 14 objects to the museum.

== Academic career ==
Blackman spent much of the 1920s and 1930s living and conducting fieldwork in rural Egypt, including leading the Percy Sladen Expedition to Egypt between 1922 and 1926. She and her brother Aylward often collaborated, such as during a study of ancient burial sites at Meir. She was also a contemporary of the German ethnographer Hans Alexander Winkler and encouraged him to pursue his work in Upper Egypt, despite others discouraging him and his "radical" views.

Unusually for the time, she chose to focus on the habits, beliefs and customs of contemporary (rather than ancient) Egyptians. She had a particular interest in the "magico-religious" ideas and practices of Upper Egypt and the experiences of ordinary rural peasantry, the fellaheen. She recorded women's fertility rituals, belief in the healing properties of tattoo marks (made by instruments of 7 needles fixed to the end of a stick) and methods for treating spirit possession. In 1927 she published The Fellahin of Upper Egypt, which became a standard work on the ethnography of the region and was reprinted in 2000. She also wrote about the notion of southern Egyptian liminality and how both Muslims and Copts shared many of the same saints.

Later in 1927 Blackman also began collecting folk medicine items for the wealthy pharmaceutical magnate and collector Sir Henry Wellcome of Burroughs Wellcome and Co. (BWC). She was forced to accept stringent conditions in return for his support (including a promise not to collect anything for anyone else, including herself). She was provided with BWC manufactured travelling medicines chests when collecting and exchanged "modern" pharmaceutical products for ethnographic objects. She collected an estimated 4,000 individual items, such as amulets, charms and figures, for Wellcome between 1926 and 1933. The items are now held in collections of the Garstang Museum of Archaeology, the Pitt Rivers Museum, the Science Museum and the Wellcome Collection.

She was a member of the Folklore Society, Royal Anthropological Institute, Royal Asiatic Society and Oxford University Anthropological Society.

After the Second World War broke out in 1939, Blackwood returned to Britain. In 1950 she was committed to a mental hospital after suffering a mental and physical breakdown after the death of her younger sister Elsie. She died shortly afterwards, aged 78.

== Works ==
- 'The Magical and Ceremonial Uses of Fire' Folklore Vol. 27, No. 4 (1916), pp. 352–377
- 'The Rosary in Magic and Religion' Folklore Vol. 29, No. 4 (1918), pp. 255–280
- 'Traces in Couvade (?) in England' Folklore Vol. 29, No. 4 (1918), pp. 319–321
- 'Some Occurrences of the Corn-‘Arūseh in Ancient Egyptian Tomb Paintings' The Journal of Egyptian Archaeology Vol. 8, No. 1 (1922), pp. 235–240.
- 'Some beliefs among the Egyptian peasants with regard to 'afarit'' Folklore Vol. 35, No. 2 (1924), pp. 176–184
- 'Sacred trees in modern Egypt' The Journal of Egyptian Archaeology Vol. 11, No.1 (1925), pp. 56–57.
- 'The Karin and Karineh' The Journal of the Royal Anthropological Institute of Great Britain and Ireland Vol 56 (1926), pp. 163–169
- The Fellāḥīn of Upper Egypt . 1927 – via Wikisource. [later translated into French (1948), and Arabic (1995)]
- 'Some Further Notes on a Harvesting Scene' The Journal of Egyptian Archaeology Vol. 19, No.1 (1933), pp. 31–32.
