= Henu (Saqqara) =

Ancient Egyptian official

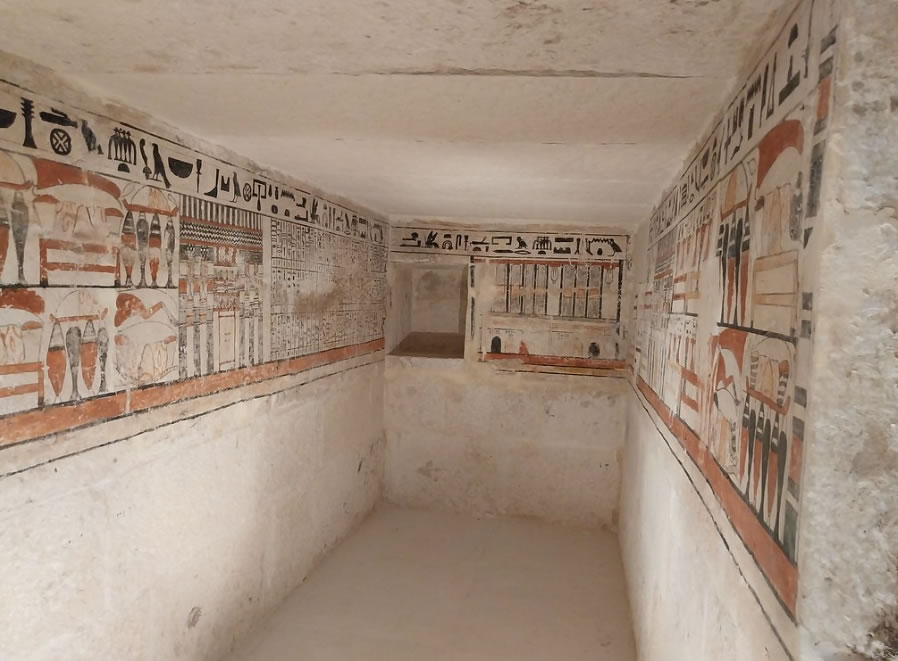
Tomb chamber of Henu

Henu was an Ancient Egyptian official of the Sixth Dynasty or early First Intermediate Period. His tomb chamber was discovered in 2022 at Saqqara, near the pyramid of king Merenre.

Henu bears he titles Haty-a, royal sealer, sole friend and overseer of the tenants of the palace. Otherwise not much else is known about him.

His tomb was found in 2022 together with four similar burials. It consisted of a mud brick chapel above ground and of a decorated burial chamber at the end of a deep shaft. The burial chamber was found looted and only contained some pottery vessels. The burial chamber is now on display in the Grand Egyptian Museum.
