= Meir, Egypt =

Archaeological site in Middle Egypt

Meir
- Location in Egypt
- Coordinates: 27°24′32″N 30°42′38″E
- Country: Egypt
- Governorate: Asyut
- Time zone: UTC+2 (EST)
  - Summer (DST): +3

The necropolis of Meir (Arabic: مقابر مير, romanized: Maqābir Mayr, lit. 'cemetery of Mayr/Meir') is an archaeological site in Middle Egypt in the Asyut Governorate located on the west bank of the Nile. Here are the graves of the nomarchs, mayors and priests of Cusae from the ancient Egyptian Old and Middle Kingdom.

The cemetery is named after the village of Meir at 27°27′N 30°45′E situated some 5 kilometers to the northeast of the cemetery and some 7 kilometers southwest of el-Qusiya or ancient Cusae.

== Overview ==
Meir was the functioning cemetery for Cusae, located in Egypt, approximately thirty to forty miles north of the city of Asyut. Meir functioned as an Old Kingdom–Middle Kingdom (6th–12th Dynasty) cemetery for the nomarchs of the fourteenth Nome of Upper Egypt. Below the hillside of the rock-cut tombs lies a cemetery that is specifically for the more common folk. The rock-cut tombs only functioned for nomarchs of the city of Cusae, which was a cult center for the Egyptian deity Hathor. Proof of Hathor worshiping was found on inscriptions on the walls of the rock-cut tombs, which included numerous mentioning of the priestesses of Hathor as well as numerous depictions of cows. Aylward Blackman was the primary excavator of the site and as a result he published six volumes of work pertaining to his findings. The tombs are laid out North to South along a hillside and Blackman labeled the chapel-tombs A–E. Meir is known to have one of the richest sources of Middle Kingdom tombs. It is also known for the tombs having extremely detailed reliefs illustrating daily life scenes. Examples of well excavated tombs of this site include the tombs of Ukh-Hotep and Pepyankh the Middle.

== Early excavations ==
Before any archaeologists could excavate Meir, many of the tombs were pillaged for timber. Later in time, fragments and incomplete tombs were burned in giant bonfires after being deemed ‘worthless and in the way.’ In 1890 Émile Gaston Chassinat sparked interest for the archaeologist community by paying a visit to the Meir site. A short time later, a number of archaeologists such as Georges Émile Jules Daressy (1900), Alessandro Barsanti, Georges Legrain (1900), Jean Clédat (1901–1902), and Sha’ban (1903), spent a decent amount of time excavating the Meir site. The reports from these excavations strictly focus on the great tombs, but even still are poorly published with limited detail. Finally, between the years 1912–1950 Aylward Blackman spent time excavating Meir and eventually released six volumes describing the various rock-cut tombs at the site. Unfortunately, Blackman focused on the more elaborate and complete tombs, leaving the less extravagant to stay unexcavated and unpublished. This is where Ahmed Bey Kamal took over the gauntlet of excavating the site, during the years 1910–1914, in an effort to excavate the less prestigious (incomplete) tombs.

== Tombs ==
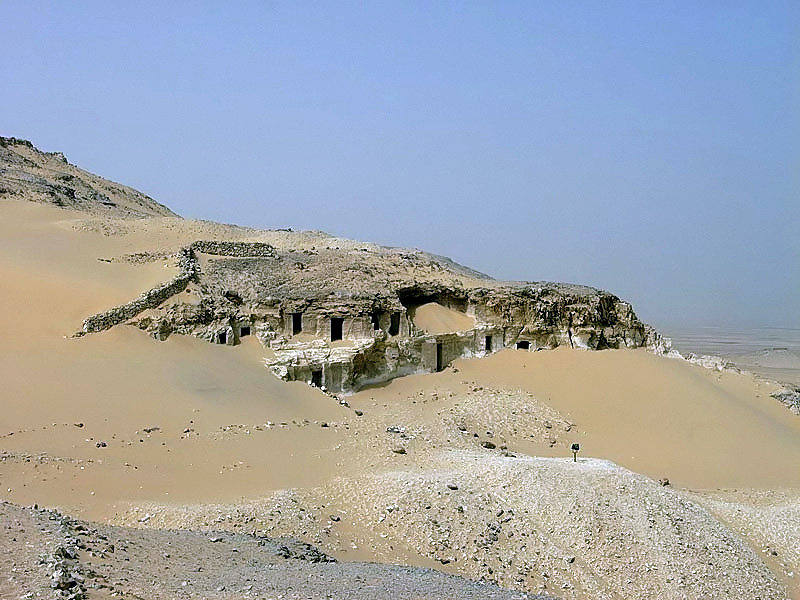
Meir tombs, group A

The tombs at Meir date back to the 6th–12th Dynasty, and they were an important burial place for the rulers of the fourteenth Nome. When it was excavated by Aylward Blackman, it was given the letters A–E in order to signify the various rock-cut tombs. The tombs were cut out into a hillside and laid out from North to South. This site holds approximately seventy five tombs with interior decoration and countless others that have been pillaged or damaged through the years. Below the main rock-cut tomb site is a cemetery dedicated to the members of the city who were not nomarchs. Not much excavation was accomplished on this particular ‘commoner’ cemetery, there is essential no information regarding that site in any of the volumes of work done by any of the main excavators of Meir.

=== Pepyankh the Middle ===
The tomb of Pepyankh the Middle (D2.), known sometimes as Heny the Middle, dates back to the time of Pepi II. Blackman published his findings on Pepyankh the Middle's tomb in 1924 in a book called, “The Rock Tombs of Meir Vol. IV: The Tomb-Chapel of Pepi’onkh the Middle son of Sebkhotpe and Pekhernefert.” and in 2012 Naguib Kanawati published a follow-up book on the tomb of Pepyankh the middle called, “The Cemetery of Meir: Vol. 1 The tomb of Pepyankh the Middle.” Upon excavation of the tombs, it was discovered that Pepyankh the middle was the son of Sebkhotpe (Hepi) and Pepkhernefert (Bebi) and that his wife was Hewetiaah. Together Pepyankh the middle and Hewetiaah had six sons and three daughters. From the tomb, it was also noted that titles held by Pepyankh the middle included: ‘Confidant of the King in his Every Place,’ ‘Overseer of Upper Egypt in Reality,’ ‘Hereditary Prince,’ ‘Superintendent of the Priests of Hathor’ and many more. The undisturbed tomb – the largest found at the cemetery of Meir – was discovered by Ahmed Bey Kamal's workmen in March 1913. Similar to the other tombs at Meir, the tomb of Pepyankh the middle had beautiful examples of daily life reliefs. There are countless descriptions of the various reliefs, one passage says “All the walls of room C are covered with painted reliefs, the brilliance of which was greatly enhanced by the dark slate-grey to indigo background…[but] as is usually the case with the productions of the sixth-dynasty provincial craftsmen, the technique of these reliefs is somewhat crude.”

=== Religion ===
In all of the decorated tombs in Meir it is evident that the goddess Hathor was an important element in the lives of the people of Cusae. In Volumes I–VI of Blackman's books, it is evident that just about all of the nomarchs, as well as their various family members, held positions relating to Hathor. Many of the nomarchs held the title, ‘Overseer of prophets of Hathor’ or ‘Priest of Hathor’ and a lot of the important women had the title, ‘Priestess of Hathor.’ In addition to the titles, there are also depictions of ceremonies relating to Hathor in the reliefs on the walls. One example of this can be found in the tomb of Senbi's son Ukh-hotp. In a relief found in his tomb there is a ceremonial picture of two bulls fighting to the death, and it is believed that this is related to winning the honor of being with the goddess cow, Hathor.

=== Tombs A–E ===
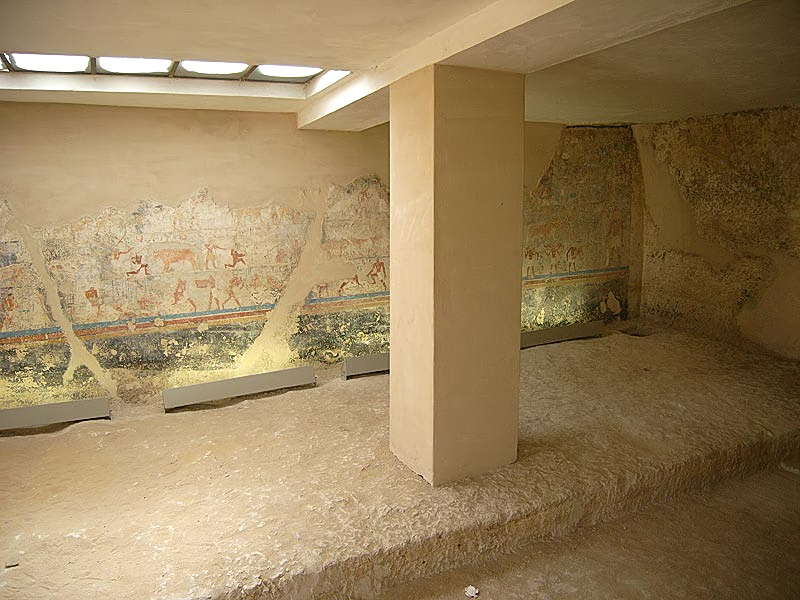
Inside of the tomb of Senbi (B1)

- A1. Niankh-Pepy-kem (Sebkhotp/Hepi-kem) (During Pepi II): Overseer of Upper Egypt; Chancellor of the King of Lower Egypt; Overseer of prophets.
- A2. Pepyankh the Black (Heni-kem) (During Pepi II): Overseer of the duckpool; Chancellor of the King of Lower Egypt; Overseer of prophets; son of Ni’ankh-Pepy-kem.
- A3. Ukhhotep (During Senusret I): Nomarch; Overseer of Sealers; son of Iam.
- A4. Hepi-kem (During Merenre Nemtyemsaf II): Overseer of Upper Egypt; Chancellor of the King of Lower Egypt; Overseer of prophets.
- B1. Senebi I (During Amenemhat I): Nomarch; Overseer of prophets; Chancellor of the King of the Lower Egypt; son of Ukh-hotp.
- B2. Ukhhotep II (During Senusret I): Nomarch of the Atef-nome; Chancellor of the King of Lower Egypt; Overseer of prophets of Hathor Mistress of Cusae; son of Senbi (B1).
- B3. Senbi (During Senusret I): Hereditary prince; Overseer of prophets; son of Ukh-hotp (B2).
- B4. Ukhhotep (During Amenemhat II): Nomarch; Overseer of prophets of Hathor Mistress of Cusae; Director of every divine office; Lector of the Great Ennead; son of Ukhhotep (A3) and Mersi.
- C1. Ukhhotep III (During Senusret II): Nomarch; Overseer of prophets; son of Ukhhotep and Heny the middle.
- C2. Kha’kheperre-sonb (Iy) (During Senusret II): Nomarch; Overseer of prophets.
- D1. Pepi: Royal scribe; Judge.
- D2. Pepy-‘ankh-hir-ib (Neferka/Heny/Pepyankh the Middle) (During Pepi II): Nomarch; Vizier; Outline-draughtsman; Overseer of prophets of Hathor Mistress of Cusae; Overseer of Upper Egypt in the central nomes.
- E1. Meni (Menia): Inspector of prophets; First under the King; Friend of the house of the royal favourites.
- E2. Nenki: Intimate; Lector.
- E3. Pepy-‘ankh (During Pepi II): Intimate; Lector.
- E4. Thetu: Overseer of the Thentet-cows, First under the King; Inspector of prophets.

== Bibliography ==
- Blackman, A.M.; Apted, M.R. (1914). The rock tombs of Meir: Part I: The tomb of Pepyankh the middle. London: Egypt Exploration Society.
- Blackman, A.M. (1915a). The rock tombs of Meir: Part II: The tomb-chapel of Senbi's son Ukh-Hotp: (B, no. 2). London: Egypt Exploration Society.
- Blackman, A.M. (1915b). The rock tombs of Meir: Part. III: The tomb-chapel of Ukh-Hotp son of Ukh-Hotp and Mersi: (B, no. 4). London: Egypt Exploration Society.
- Blackman, A.M. (1924). The rock tombs of Meir: Part IV: The tomb-chapel of Pepi'onkh the middle son of Sebkhotpe and Pekhernefert (D, no. 2). London: Egypt Exploration Society.
- Blackman, A.M.; Apted, M.R. (1953a). The rock tombs of Meir: Part V. London: Egypt Exploration Society.
- Blackman, A.M.; Apted, M.R. (1953b). The rock tombs of Meir: Part VI. London: Egypt Exploration Society.
- Kanawati, N.; Evans, L. (2012). The cemetery of Meir I: The tomb of Pepyankh the Middle. Oxford: Aris and Phillips.
- Kanawati, N.; Evans, L. (2014). The cemetery of Meir II: The tomb of Pepyankh the Black. Oxford: Aris and Phillips.
- Porter, B.; Moss, R. The Digital Topographical Bibliography of Ancient Egyptian Hieroglyphic Texts, Statues, Reliefs, and Paintings, volume 4. Oxford: Clarendon Press.
- Willems, Harco (1988). Chests of Life: A study of the typology and conceptual development of Middle Kingdom standard class coffins. Leiden: Ex Oriente Lux.
