= Henu =

Henu may refer to:

- Henan University (HENU), a provincial public university in Zhengzhou and Kaifeng, Henan, China
- Hennu, also 'Henu', a boat and symbol of the god Seker in ancient Egyptian mythology
- Hénu, a commune in northern France
- Ro-henu, a dry river bed and ancient first bend of the Mu-Qed trade route
- Henu (Saqqara), ancient egyptian official

== See also ==
- Henenu (high steward), also 'Hannu' or 'Hennu', an ancient Egyptian official serving under Mentuhotep II
