= Fellah =

Farmer or agricultural laborer in the Middle East and North Africa

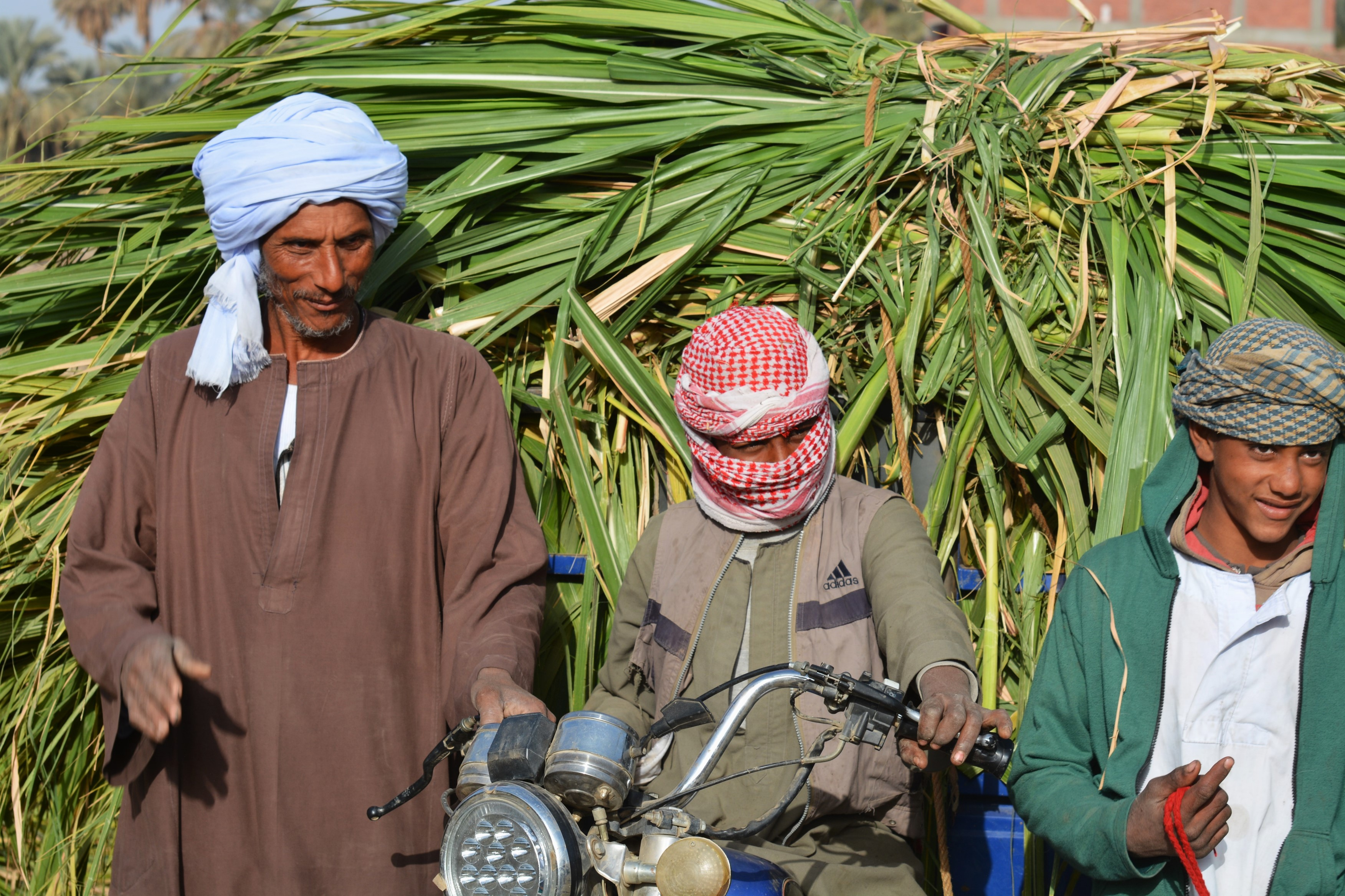

A fellah (Arabic: فَلَّاح fallāḥ, feminine فَلَّاحَة fallāḥa, plural فَلَّاحِين fallāḥīn) is a farmer or agricultural labourer in the Middle East and North Africa. The word is Arabic for 'ploughman' or 'tiller'.

In Egypt, fellahin refers to farmers, whether they are from the north or the south of the country. Due to a continuity in beliefs and lifestyle with that of the Ancient Egyptians, the fellahin of Egypt have been described as the "true" Egyptians.

== Origins and usage ==
Fellahin, throughout the Middle East in the Islamic periods, referred to native villagers and farmers. It is translated as "peasants" or "farmers". Fellahin were distinguished from the effendi (land-owning class), although the fellahin in this region might be tenant farmers, smallholders, or live in a village that owned the land communally. Others applied the term fellahin only to landless workers.

== In Egypt ==
The fellahin of Egypt are indigenous rural villagers living in Upper Egypt and Lower Egypt in Egypt, and their agricultural methods contributed to the rise of Ancient Egypt. The fellahin are mostly Muslims who live in the Nile Valley.

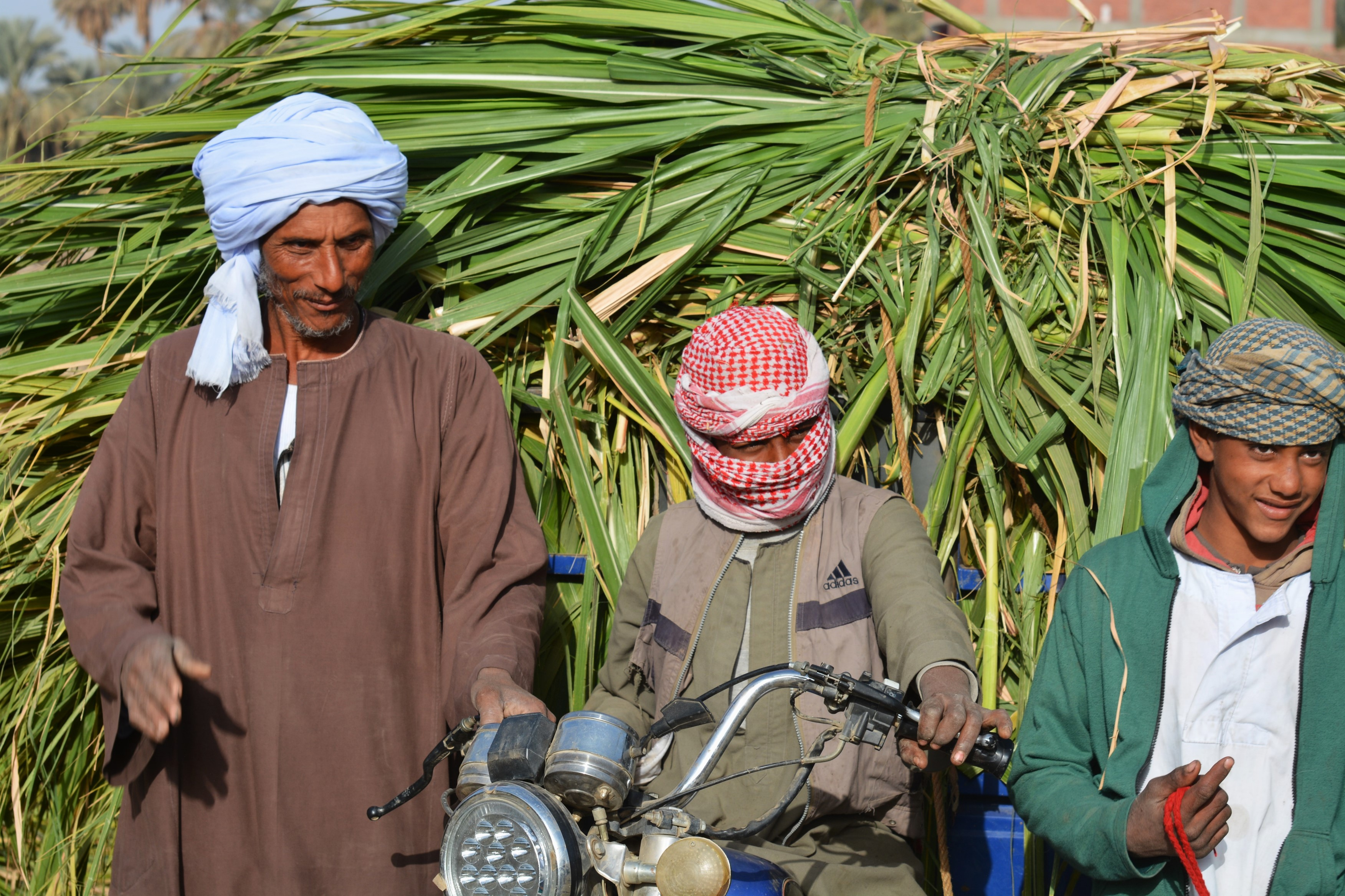
An Egyptian farming family

After the Muslim conquest, the rulers called the common masses of farmers fellahin because they worked in agriculture and due to their connection to their lands.

The Egyptologist E. A. Wallis Budge, wrote with regard to the Egyptian fellah: "...no amount of alien blood has so far succeeded in destroying the fundamental characteristics, both physical and mental, of the 'dweller of the Nile mud,' i.e. the fellah, or tiller of the ground who is today what he has ever been." He would rephrase stating, "the physical type of the Egyptian fellah is exactly what it was in the earliest dynasties of ancient Egypt."

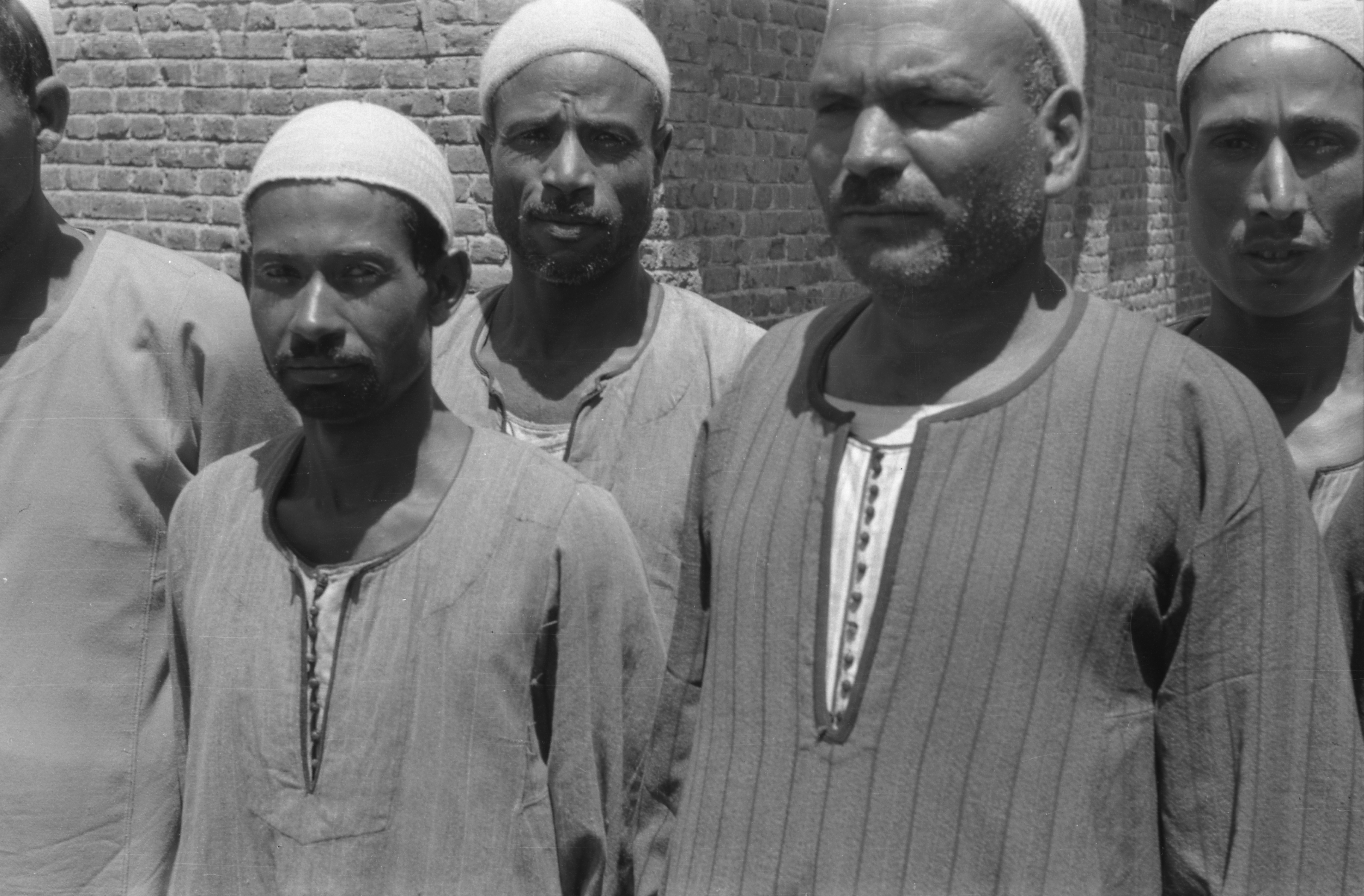
A group of Egyptian fellahs, 1955

The percentage of fellahin in Egypt was much higher than it is now in the early 20th century, before large numbers migrated into urban towns and cities. In 1927, anthropologist Winifred Blackman, author of The Fellahin of Upper Egypt, conducted ethnographic research on the life of Upper Egyptian farmers and concluded that there were observable continuities between the cultural and religious beliefs and practices of the fellahin and those of ancient Egyptians.

In 2005, they comprised some 60 percent of the total Egyptian population.

== In the Levant ==
In the Levant, specifically in Palestine, Lebanon, Jordan and Hauran, the term fellahin was used to refer to the majority of the countryside. The term fallah was also applied to native people from several regions in the North Africa and the Middle East, also including those of Cyprus.

== In Iraq ==
The Fellahin in Iraq are the rural inhabitants who relied primarily on agriculture as their main source of livelihood. Historically, the term Fellahin in Iraq was used to refer to villagers closely associated with the land and agricultural work.

== In Dobruja ==
During the nineteenth century, some Muslim Fellah families from Ottoman Syria settled in Dobruja, a region now divided between Bulgaria and Romania, then part of the Ottoman Empire. They fully intermingled with the Turks and Tatars, and were Turkified.

== Gallery ==
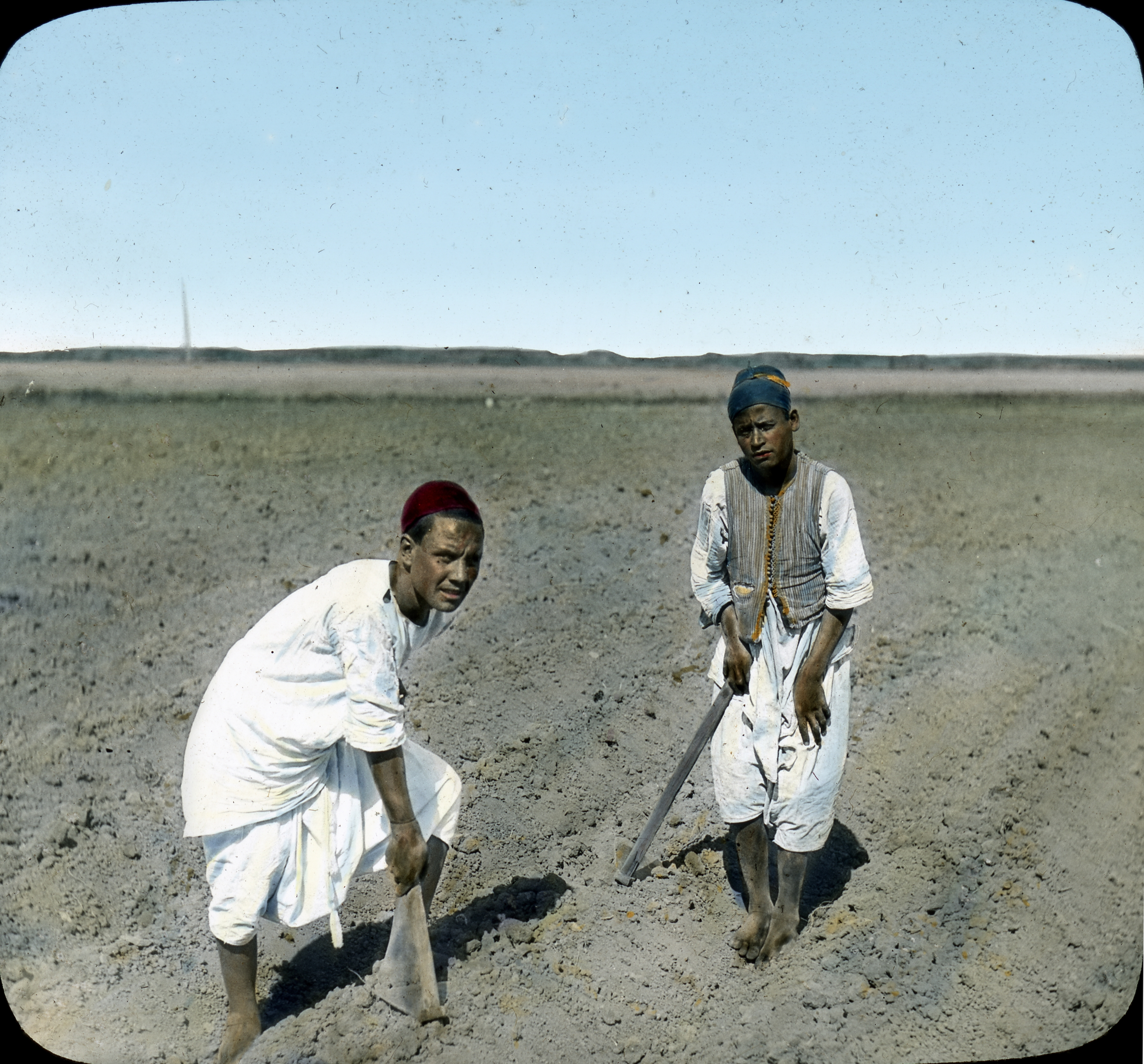
Fellahin with hoes in the fields near Cairo

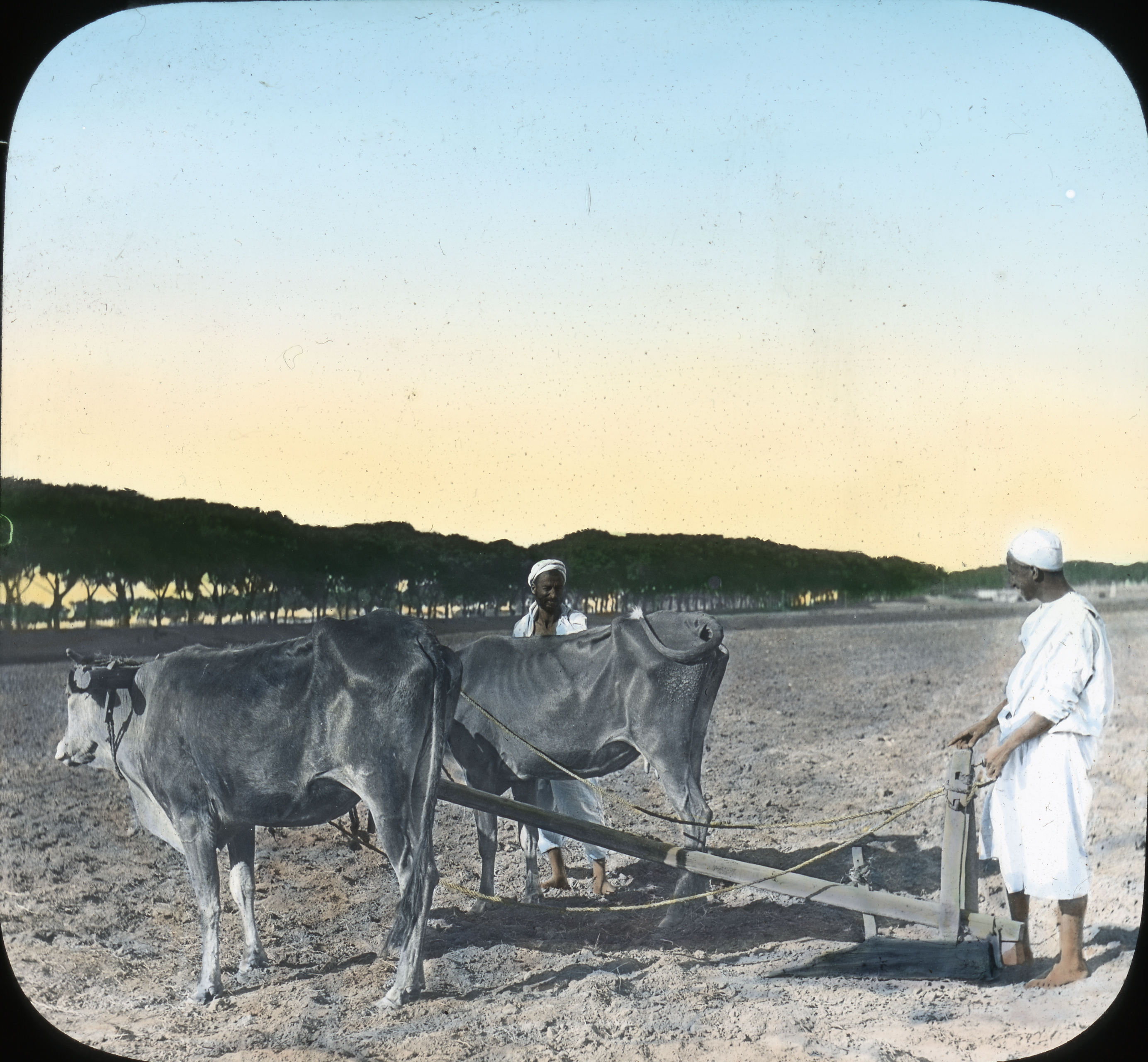
Egyptian fellahin using a traditional agricultural plow

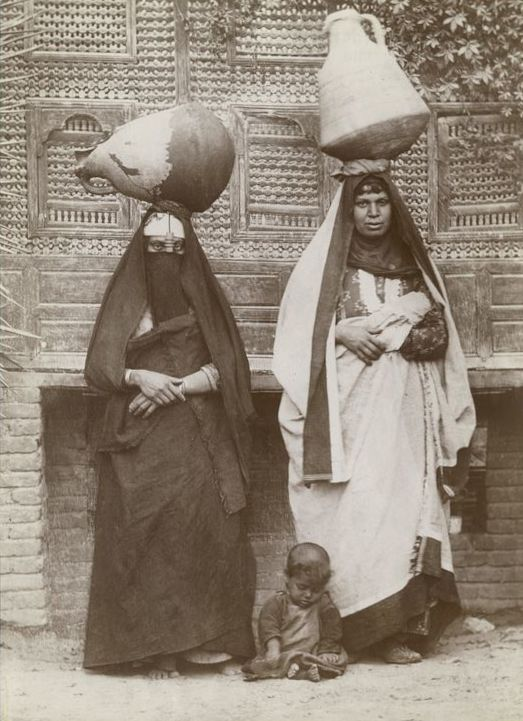
Fellah women (1860s-1920s)

== See also ==
- Egyptians
- Copts
- Peasant
