= El Hawawish =

Ancient necropolis in Egypt

Coordinates: 26°36′N 31°49′E

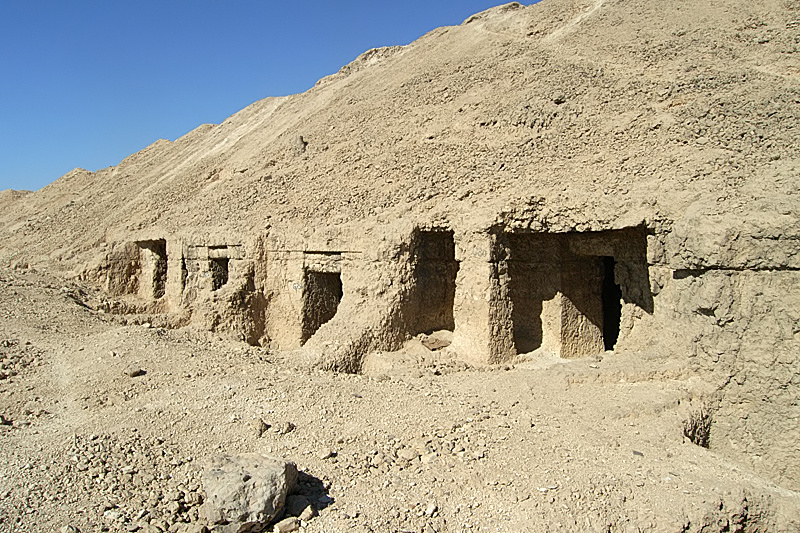
Rock tombs at El Hawawish

El Hawawish (Arabic: الحواويش) is the ancient necropolis (cemetery) for the city of Akhmim in the 9th Nome of Upper Egypt (UE09), in modern the Sohag Governorate, Egypt.

== History ==
=== Old Kingdom and First Intermediate Period ===
The local deity of El Hawawish was the fertility and productivity god Min, similar to nearby Akhmim.

Tombs of the Old Kingdom and First Intermediate Period are located in the El Hawawish mountain.

- Name not preserved (J 2), FIP
- Tjeti (I 49) 9th Dynasty
- Kheni-ankhu (H 15) 8/9/10th dynasty
- Rehu-Rausen (BA 17) 10th Dynasty
- Bawi (BA 14) 10th Dynasty

== Archaeology ==
The cemetery was excavated extensively by an Australian archaeological and epigraphic expedition under the auspices of the Australian Centre for Egyptology and Macquarie University and the direction of Professor Naguib Kanawati.

== See also ==
- List of ancient Egyptian sites, including sites of temples

== Bibliography ==
- Naguib Kanawati, with contributions by Ann McFarlane, Colin Hope, Nabil Charoubim, John Curro, Naguib Maksoud, Reece Scannell, Elizabeth Thompson, Naguib Victor, Gaye Wilson, The Rock Tombs of El-Hawawish: The Cemetery of Akhmim, Volumes I–X, (The Ancient History Documentary Research Centre, Sydney, 1980–1992).
- (Australian Centre for Egyptology Studies: 2) Naguib Kanawati, with a Chapter by Ann McFarlane, Akhmim in the Old Kingdom, Part I: Chronology and Administration, (Sydney, 1992). ISBN 0-85668-603-4.
