= Cusae =

Cusae ⲕⲱⲥⲉⲓ ⲕⲟⲥⲉⲓ القوصية
- City
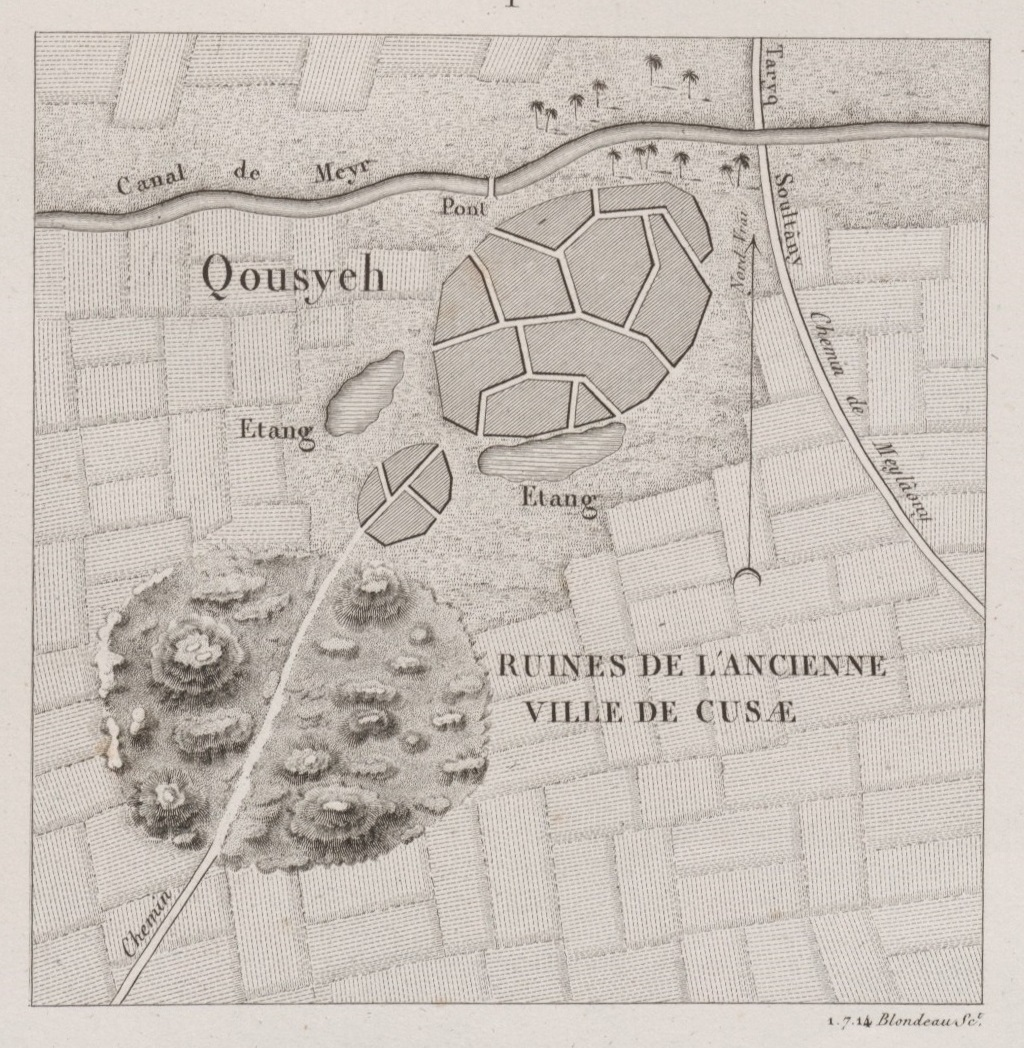
- Old map of Cusae from Description de l'Égypte

- Location within Egypt
- Coordinates: 27°26′40″N 30°49′00″E
- Country: Egypt
- Time zone: UTC+2 (EST)

A39 s y niwt or A38
ḳsj
in hieroglyphs

Cusae (Ancient Greek: Κοῦσαι or Κῶς; Coptic: ⲕⲱⲥⲉⲓ or ⲕⲟⲥⲉⲓ) was a city in Upper Egypt. Its Ancient Egyptian name was qjs (variant qsy), conventionally rendered Qis or Kis, with many further transliterations such as Qosia. Today, the town is known as El Quseyya, and is located on the west bank of the Nile in the Asyut Governorate.

== History ==
Cusae was the capital of the 14th Nome of Upper Egypt.

=== Middle Kingdom ===
It was a cult centre for Hathor, and also contained a necropolis, Meir, which was used during the Middle Kingdom to hold the tombs of local aristocrats.

=== New Kingdom ===
At the beginning of the reign of the Theban pharaoh Kamose, Cusae marked the boundary between the northern Hyksos realm (the 15th Dynasty) and the southern Theban kingdom (the 17th Dynasty).

=== Roman Period ===
During the 5th century, the city was the settlement of Legio II Flavia Constantia.

== Bishopric ==
The bishopric of Cusae was a suffragan of the metropolitan see of Antinoë, capital of the Roman province of Thebaid I. Achilles (or Achilleus) was ordained bishop of the see by Meletius of Lycopolis. Another, Elias, was of the 4th or 5th centuries. Theonas took part in the Second Council of Constantinople (553). Later bishops took the non-Chalcedonian side, the first of them being Gregorius, who assisted Pope John II (III) of Alexandria on his deathbed.

No longer a residential bishopric, Cusae is today listed by the Catholic Church as a titular see.

== See also ==
- List of ancient Egyptian towns and cities
