= Iry-pat =

Ancient Egyptian peerage rank

r p a
Iry-pat
in hieroglyphs

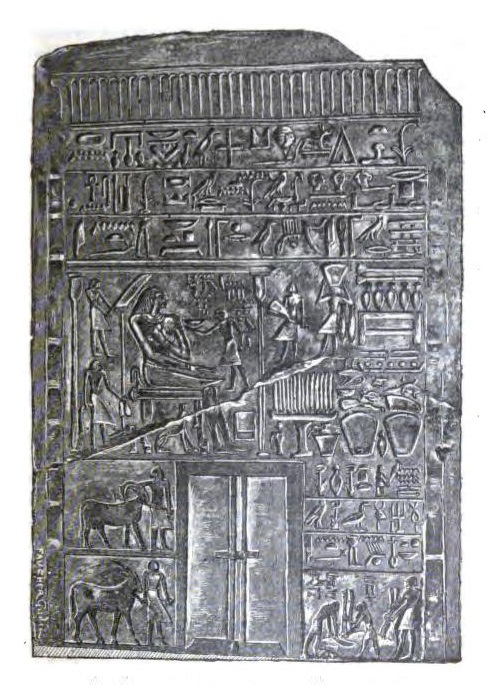
Stele of Intef the Elder, called an iry-pat at the beginning of the second row

Iry-pat (Ancient Egyptian: jrj-pꜥt "member of the elite") was an ancient Egyptian ranking title announcing a high position in the hierarchy of the country. Iry-pat was the highest ranking title at the royal court, and only the most important officials could bear this title. It is attested as early as during the First Dynasty: one of the first confirmed holders was Merka, official under king Qa'a. The title's use by women occurs from the reign of Pepi II Neferkare of the Sixth Dynasty onwards.

The title literally means "member of the pat", with "pat" being the highest level of the elite. It is conventionally translated as "hereditary prince", "nobleman", or "hereditary noble" depending on context. The female version, iryt-pat, is often translated as "hereditary princess" but did not indicate the bearer had a claim to the throne.

In the late Eighteenth Dynasty of the New Kingdom, the title was given to the king's nominated heir where he had no living children to inherit. Tutankhamun designated his general Horemheb as iry-pat and successor. On his coronation stela, Horemheb recounts that the king "set him to be supreme chief of the land in order to steer the laws of the Two Regions as Hereditary Prince [iry-pat] of this entire land". Horemheb in turn nominated his own general Paramessu as iry-pat who succeeded him as Ramesses I. In the reigns of Ramesses' son Seti I and grandson Ramesses II, the title was given to the crown prince, where it appeared at the start of the list of titles alongside "king's eldest son" (sꜣ nsw smsw).
