= Aylward M. Blackman =

British egyptologist (1883–1956)

Aylward Manley Blackman
- Blackman in c1930s-1940s
- Born: 30 January 1883; Dawlish, Devon, England
- Died: 9 March 1956 (aged 73); Abergele, Conwy, Wales

Academic background
- Education: St Paul's School
- Alma mater: The Queen's College, Oxford

Academic work
- Discipline: Egyptologist
- Sub-discipline: Nubia; Egyptian temples
- Institutions: Egypt Exploration Society; Worcester College, Oxford; University of Liverpool; University of Manchester

Aylward Manley Blackman, FBA (30 January 1883 – 9 March 1956) was a British Egyptologist, who excavated various sites in Egypt and Nubia, notably Buhen and Meir. Having taught at Worcester College, Oxford, he was Brunner Professor of Egyptology at the University of Liverpool from 1934 to 1948. He was additionally a special lecturer at the University of Manchester, and was involved in or led a number of excavations with the Egypt Exploration Society.

== Early life and education ==
Blackman was born in Dawlish, Devon, the eldest son of Rev. James Henry Blackman and Mary Anne Blackman (née Jacob). He was educated at home and his interest in archaeology was inspired by his father, a keen amateur archaeologist who created archaeological digs by burying home made 'tablets' for his children to discover. Aylward's oldest sister, Winifred Susan Blackman, (1872–1950), also became an Egyptologist. He joined St Paul's School at the age of sixteen and gained a scholarship to study at Queen's College, Oxford. At Oxford, Blackman was a pupil of Francis Llewellyn Griffith, and graduated with a First Class degree in Oriental Studies in 1906.

== Academic career ==
After graduation, Blackman worked in Nubia as an assistant on Reisner's Archaeological Survey of Nubia, 1907–1908, and the excavation of Buhen by the University of Pennsylvania. Blackman also carried out a survey of the temples of Nubia, including the temples at Biga, Dendur, and Derr. He was unable to complete the survey after he suffered a major attack of Typhoid fever at Gerf Hussein, which affected his health for the rest of his life. Due to his research, Blackman was appointed the Oxford Nubian Research Fellow and assisted Griffith in his excavation of Farras.

Blackman was the Laycock Fellow of Egyptology at Worcester College, Oxford, from 1912 to 1934. During this period he became closely associated with the Egypt Exploration Society and was a member of the Society's committee for many years. On behalf of the Society, he directed the excavation of Meir, (1912–1914, 1921, 1949–1950) and the excavation of Sesebi, Sudan, (1936–1937).

From 1934 to 1948, he was the Brunner Professor of Egyptology at the University of Liverpool, and taught in the Liverpool Institute of Archaeology. His research during this period was affected by a serious accident in Germany in 1936 which left him hospitalised and a bombing raid in 1941 which destroyed his home and his work place. Despite the set backs, Blackman was able to introduced important changes to the teaching of Egyptology at Liverpool and lead the conversion of the Institute of Archaeology into a properly constituted school of the University. Blackman was also a special lecturer in Egyptology at the University of Manchester, (1936–1948), and the tutor of the Crown Prince of Ethiopia, Amha Selassie (1937–1939).

After his retirement in 1948, Blackman returned to Meir for one final season and published his research on the site in 1953. He was elected a fellow of the British Academy in 1953.

He died in 1956 in Abergele.

== Selected works ==
- The temple of Dendur. Cairo: l'Inst. Francais d'Archeologie Orientale. 1911.
- The temple of Derr. Cairo: l'Inst. Français d'Archéologie Orientale. 1913.
- The temple of Bigeh. Cairo: l'Inst. Francais d' Archeologie Orientale. 1915.
- Luxor and its temples. London: A. & C. Black. 1923.
- English translation, from the German Literatur der Aegypter (1923): Adolf Erman, The Literature of the Ancient Egyptians, London, Methuen & Co., 1927. Reprinted by Harper & Row, 1966, as The Ancient Egyptians: A Sourcebook of their Writings.
- Middle-Egyptian Stories. Brussels: Fondation Égyptologique Reine Élisabeth. 1932.
- The Rock Tombs of Meir. London; Boston: Egypt Exploration Fund (Egypt Exploration Society). 1914–1953.
  - Aylward Manley Blackman; Michael R. Apted (1915). The Rock Tombs of Meir: Part 2. Sold at the offices of the Egypt exploration fund.
- Lloyd, Alan B., ed. (1998). Gods, priests, and men : studies in the religion of pharaonic Egypt. London; New York: Kegan Paul International. ISBN 978-0-7103-0412-4.

== See also ==
- List of Egyptologists
