= Haty-a =

Ancient Egyptian title

F4 D36 A1
Ḥaty-a
in hieroglyphs

Ḥaty-a was an ancient Egyptian rank and title given to local princes, mayors, or governors.

There is no standard translation for Ḥaty-a, and it is frequently left transliterated in scholarly literature.

In strings of ranking titles Ḥaty-a most often appears between the ranking titles iry-pat and royal sealer (ḫtmty-bỉty) and was therefore a sign of an extremely high status in the ranking of officials in Ancient Egypt. As mayor, the title often stands alone in inscription in front of the name, but was also often combined with the titles overseer of priests or overseer of the god's house, indicating that local governors were also the head of local religious matters.
