= Naguib Kanawati =

Egyptian-Australian egyptologist

- نجيب قنواتي
- Born: May 27, 1941; Alexandria, Kingdom of Egypt
- Awards: Fellow of the Australian Academy of the Humanities (FAHA)
- Honors: Order of Australia (AO) (2007); Centenary Medal (2001)

Academic background
- Education: Alexandria University (B.A., M.A.); Macquarie University (Ph.D.)

Academic work
- Discipline: Egyptology, archaeology
- Notable works: Fieldwork and publications on the Old Kingdom tombs at Saqqara, Giza, Meir, and El-Hawawish

Naguib Kanawati AM FAHA (Arabic: نجيب قنواتي) (May 27, 1941) is an Egyptian Australian Egyptologist and Professor of Egyptology at Macquarie University in Sydney, New South Wales, Australia.

== Early life ==
Kanawati was born in Alexandria, Egypt to a Melkite Greek Catholic family of Syro-Lebanese descent.

== Career ==
A native of Alexandria, Egypt, he obtained a master's degree in business administration and later emigrated to Sydney, Australia, where he obtained his second Master's degree and Doctorate, both in Egyptology. He subsequently joined the academic staff of the university, as lecturer in History (1980–1983), and Associate Professor in Egyptology (1984–1990).

From 1990, Kanawati became Macquarie University's first Professor in Egyptology and holds a Personal Chair in that subject. He was instrumental in the formation of the Rundle Foundation for Egyptian Archaeology in the late 1970s and was the founder, in 1989, of the Australian Centre for Egyptology, which coordinates all Australian excavations in Egypt with the Egyptian Supreme Council of Antiquities.

Kanawati's research interests focus on the Old Kingdom period of Egypt, its burial customs, art history, and socio-political development. He has directed numerous excavations and epigraphic expeditions, at sites including the entire mountain of El-Hawawish (in excess of 800 Old Kingdom and First Intermediate Period rock-cut tombs), Quseir El Amarna, El Hagarsa (near Sohag), Deir El Gebrawi, Giza, as well as the Unis and Teti pyramid cemeteries at Saqqara, Meir and Beni Hassan.

== Other interests ==
- He is also the current vice-president (and member for many years) of the Parish Council of the Melkite Catholic Eparchy Church of Australia and New Zealand; vice-president, Eparchy Pastoral Council; the chairman of its Aged Care Committee; chairman of the Melkite Board of Study; and former chair of its finance committee.
- He was the founding committee member of the Holy Saviour Community School, continuing on the committee since 1997.

== Honours and awards ==
- Kanawati was elected a Fellow of the Australian Academy of the Humanities in 1997.
- On 1 January 2001 he was awarded the Australian Centenary Medal "for services to Australian society and the humanities in the study of prehistory and archaeology".
- In the Queen's Birthday Honours awarded on 11 June 2007 he was appointed a Member of the Order of Australia "for service to education through research and the promotion and advancement of the study of Egyptology, and to the community."
- On 10 February 2010 Zahi Hawass presented Kanawati with a Festschrift to celebrate his contribution to the discipline of Egyptology over the past 35 years.

== Bibliography ==
=== Ancient History Documentary Research Centre (Macquarie University) ===
- Naguib Kanawati, with contributions by Ann McFarlane, Colin Hope, Nabil Charoubim, John Curro, Naguib Maksoud, Reece Scannell, Elizabeth Thompson, Naguib Victor, Gaye Wilson, The Rock Tombs of El-Hawawish: The Cemetery of Akhmim, Volumes I–X. (Sydney, 1980–1992).
- Naguib Kanawati, Ali El-Khouli, Ann McFarlane, & Naguib V. Maksoud, Excavations at Saqqara: North-West of Teti's Pyramid, Volume I (Sydney, 1984). ISBN 0-85837-626-1.
- Ali El-Khouli & Naguib Kanawati, with contributions by Elizabeth Thompson, Naguib Victor, Ann McFarlane, Reece Scannell and H. El-Tayeb, Excavations at Saqqara North-West of Teti's Pyramid, Volume II, (Sydney, 1988).

=== The Australian Centre for Egyptology: Reports ===
- (Reports: 1) Ali El-Khouli & Naguib Kanawati, Quseir El-Amarna: The Tombs of Pepy-ankh and Khewen-Wekh, (Sydney, 1989). ISBN 0-85668-508-9 and ISBN 0-85837-663-6.
- (Reports: 2) Ali El-Khouli & Naguib Kanawati, The Old Kingdom Tombs of El-Hammamiya, (Sydney, 1990). ISBN 0-85668-567-4 and ISBN 0-85837-702-0.
- (Reports: 4) Naguib Kanawati, with contributions by Ann McFarlane, Elizabeth Thompson, Nabil Charoubim & Naguib Victor, The Tombs of El-Hagarsa, Volume 1, (Sydney, 1993): ISBN 0-85668-602-6. Later published in 1997 under ISBN 0-85837-805-1.
- (Reports: 5) Naguib Kanawati & Ann McFarlane, with contributions by Nabil Charoubim, Naguib Victor and A. Salama, Deshasha: The Tombs of Inti, Shedu and Others, (Sydney, 1993). ISBN 0-85668-617-4.
- (Reports: 6) Naguib Kanawati, with contributions by E.S. Bailey, N. Charoubim, R.A. David, P. Dyer, R. Elles, R.P. Evans, C. Griffiths, C.W. Griggs, R. Harris, N. Iskander, A. Ivinson, M.C.J. Kuchar, A. McFarlane, M.J. Rowe, R. Shnier, E. Tapp, E. Thompson, L. Turnbull, N. Victor, K. Wildsmith, and S.R. Woodward, The Tombs of El-Hagarsa, Volume 2, (Sydney, 1993). ISBN 0-85668-616-6 and ISBN 1-86408-056-6.
- (Reports: 7) N. Kanawati, with contributions by Ann McFarlane, Elizabeth Thompson, N. Charoubim, and Naguib Victor, The Tombs of El-Hagarsa, Volume 3, (Sydney, 1995). ISBN 1-86408-004-3 (hardcover).
- (Reports: 8) Naguib Kanawati & Ali Hassan, with contributions by Paul Bentley, Alan Cavanagh, Nabil Charoubim, Ann McFarlane, Sameh Shafik, Karin Sowada, Elizabeth Thompson and Naguib Victor, The Teti Cemetery at Saqqara, Volume I: The Tombs of Nedjet-em-pet, Ka-aper and Others, (Sydney, 1996). ISBN 0-85668-680-8.
- (Reports: 9) Naguib Kanawati & Ali Hassan, with contributions by Alan Cavanagh, Ann McFarlane, Sameh Shafik and Naguib Victor, The Teti Cemetery at Saqqara, Volume II: The Tomb of Ankhmahor, (Warminster, 1997). ISBN 0-85668-802-9.
- (Reports: 11) Naguib Kanawati & Mahmoud Abder-Raziq, with contributions by Ann McFarlane, Sameh Shafik, Elizabeth Thompson & Naguib Victor, The Teti Cemetery at Saqqara, Volume III: The Tombs of Neferseshemre and Seankhuiptah, (Warminster, 1998). ISBN 0-85668-804-5.
- (Reports: 13) Naguib Kanawati & Mahmoud Abder-Raziq, with contributions by Ann McFarlane, Sameh Shafik, Elizabeth Thompson & Naguib Victor, The Teti Cemetery at Saqqara, Volume V: The Tomb of Hesi, (Warminster, 1999). ISBN 0-85668-814-2.
- (Reports: 14) Naguib Kanawati & Mahmoud Abder-Raziq, with contributions by L. Horácková, Ann McFarlane, Sameh Shafik, Mark Spigelman, Eugen Strouhal, Elizabeth Thompson and Naguib Victor, The Teti Cemetery at Saqqara, Volume VI: The Tomb of Nikauisesi, (Warminster, 2000). ISBN 0-85668-819-3.
- (Reports: 16) Naguib Kanawati, with a Preface by Zahi Hawass and contributions by Ann McFarlane, Sameh Shafik, Elizabeth Thompson & Naguib Victor, Tombs at Giza, Volume I: Kaiemankh (G4561) and Seshemnefer (G4940), (Warminster, 2001). ISBN 0-85668-805-3.
- (Reports: 17) Naguib Kanawati & Mahmoud Abder-Raziq, with contributions by L. Horácková, Ann McFarlane, T.H. Schmidt-Schultz, M. Schultz, Sameh Shafik, Eugen Strouhal, Elizabeth Thompson, Naguib Victor and Roxie Walker, The Teti Cemetery at Saqqara, Volume VII: The Tombs of Shepsipuptah, Mereri (Merinebti), Hefi and Others, (Warminster, 2001). ISBN 0-85668-806-1.
- (Reports: 18) Naguib Kanawati, Tombs at Giza, Volume II: Seshathetep/Heti (G5150), Nesutnefer (G4970) and Seshemnefer II (G5080), (Warminster, 2002). ISBN 0-85668-815-0.
- (Reports: 19) Naguib Kanawati & Mahmoud Abder-Raziq, with contributions by Ann McFarlane, T.H. Schmidt-Schultz, M. Schultz, Sameh Shafik, Eugen Strouhal, Elizabeth Thompson, Naguib Victor, Roxie Walker and Alex Woods, The Unis Cemetery at Saqqara, Volume II: The Tombs of Iynefert and Ihy (re-used by Idut), (Oxford, 2003). ISBN 0-85668-813-4 and ISBN 0-85668-821-5.
- (Reports: 21) Naguib Kanawati & Mahmoud Abder-Raziq, with contributions by Effy Alexakis, R. Gargour, Kim McCorquodale, Sameh Shafik, Elizabeth Thompson, Naguib Victor & Alex Woods, Mereruka and His Family, Part 1: The Tomb of Meryteti, (Oxford, 2004). ISBN 0-85668-816-9.
- (Reports: 23) Naguib Kanawati, with contributions by Effy Alexakis, Sameh Shafik, M. Momtaz, Elizabeth Thompson, Naguib Victor & Alex Woods, Deir El-Gebrawi, Volume I: The Northern Cliff, (Oxford, 2005). ISBN 0-85668-807-X.
- (Reports: 24) Naguib Kanawati, with chapters by Anne McFarlane & Karin Sowada, and contributions by Effy Alexakis, Sameh Shafik, Elizabeth Thompson, Naguib Victor, & Alex Woods, The Teti Cemetery at Saqqara, Volume VIII: The Tomb of Inumin, (Warminster, 2006). ISBN 0-85668-810-X.
- (Reports: 25) Naguib Kanawati, Deir El-Gebrawi, Volume II: The Southern Cliff, (Aris & Phillips, 2006). ISBN 0-85668-808-8.

=== The Australian Centre for Egyptology: Studies ===
- (Studies: 2) Naguib Kanawati, with a Chapter by Ann McFarlane, Akhmim in the Old Kingdom, Part I: Chronology and Administration, (Sydney, 1992). ISBN 0-85668-603-4.

=== Other books ===
- Naguib Kanawati, Egyptian Administration in the Old Kingdom: Evidence on its Economic Decline (Doctoral Thesis, Macquarie Univ, 1974), (June 1977), ISBN 0-85668-102-4.
- Naguib Kanawati, Governmental Reforms in Old Kingdom Egypt, (Warminster, 1980), ISBN 0-85668-168-7.
- Naguib Kanawati, The tomb and its significance in ancient Egypt (Prism archaeological series, 1987). ISBN 977-367-159-3.
- Naguib Kanawati, Sohag in Upper Egypt: A glorious history (Prism archaeological series, 1990), ISBN 977-235-002-5.
- Naguib Kanawati, with photography by Reece Scannell, A Mountain Speaks: The First Australian Excavation in Egypt, (Macquarie University, Sydney, Australia, 1988): ISBN 0-85837-633-4 (hardcover & paperpack). Published later in the United Kingdom as The Mountain Speaks, (Warminster, 1995): ISBN 0-85668-570-4 (paperback).
- Naguib Kanawati, The Tomb and Beyond: Burial Customs of the Egyptian Officials, (Warminster, 2002). ISBN 0-85668-734-0.
- Naguib Kanawati, Conspiracies in the Egyptian Palace: Unis to Pepy I, (Routledge, 2002). ISBN 0-415-27107-X.
