= List of World Heritage Sites in Egypt =

Location of World Heritage Sites in Egypt. Blue dots represent the sites of the Nubian Monuments.

The United Nations Educational, Scientific and Cultural Organization (UNESCO) World Heritage Sites are places of importance to cultural or natural heritage as described in the UNESCO World Heritage Convention, established in 1972. Cultural heritage consists of monuments (such as architectural works, monumental sculptures, or inscriptions), groups of buildings, and sites (including archaeological sites). Natural features (consisting of physical and biological formations), geological and physiographical formations (including habitats of threatened species of animals and plants), and natural sites which are important from the point of view of science, conservation, or natural beauty, are defined as natural heritage. Egypt ratified the convention on 7 February 1974, the second country to do so, after the United States. There are seven World Heritage Sites in Egypt, and a further 34 sites on the tentative list.

The first sites in Egypt were listed in 1979, when five properties were inscribed. Since then, two more sites have been listed, Saint Catherine Area in 2002 and Wadi al Hitan in 2005. The latter is the only natural site in Egypt, the other sites being listed for their cultural properties. One of the key events that triggered the development of the World Heritage Convention was related to Egypt. Following the decision to construct the Aswan Dam on the Nile which would result in flooding of numerous archaeological sites in Lower Nubia, an international campaign was launched in 1959 to preserve the sites by dismantling them and reassembling them at safe locations. From 2001 to 2025, Abu Mena was listed as endangered because the rising water table was decreasing the stability of clay-based soils, resulting in threats to the structural integrity of the monuments. The situation has improved by 2024. Egypt has served on the World Heritage Committee five times.

== World Heritage Sites ==
UNESCO lists sites under ten criteria; each entry must meet at least one of the criteria. Criteria i through vi are cultural, and vii through x are natural.

World Heritage Sites
Site	Image	Location (governorate)	Year listed	UNESCO data	Description
Memphis and its Necropolis – the Pyramid Fields from Giza to Dahshur	Pyramids of Giza	Giza	1979	86; i, iii, vi (cultural)	Memphis was the capital of the Old Kingdom of Egypt and was founded around 3000 BCE. Its most important temple was dedicated to Ptah. The Pyramid fields comprise some of the main clusters of Egyptian pyramids, including the Giza pyramid complex (pictured) with the Great Pyramid of Giza (the only one surviving of the Seven Wonders of the World) and the Great Sphinx, pyramids at Dahshur, the complex at Saqqara, and the complex at Abusir. There are more than 38 pyramids in the area, as well as their architectural predecessors, mastabas, rock tombs, and temples.
Ancient Thebes with its Necropolis	Temple ruins with several standing statues and an obelisk	Luxor	1979	87; i, iii, vi (cultural)	Thebes was the capital of Egypt for long periods during the Middle Kingdom and New Kingdom eras. It was the holy city of Amun and the religious capital for most of Egypt's history. The main monuments date from the period from 1500 to 1000 BCE and include colossal temples at Karnak and Luxor (pictured) and royal tombs in the Valley of the Kings and the Valley of the Queens. Some of the best known are the Mortuary temple of Hatshepsut and the Tomb of Tutankhamun.
Nubian Monuments from Abu Simbel to Philae	Historical photo depicting moving of the statues of the Abu Simbel temple using a crane	Aswan	1979	88; i, iii, vi (cultural)	This site comprises ten monuments from different periods of Egyptian history that were relocated in an international campaign from the 1960s to 1980s to save them from the rising waters of the Nile, following the construction of the Aswan Dam. The monuments are: Abu Simbel (commissioned by Ramesses II, relocation pictured), New Amada, New Wadi Sebua, New Kalabsha, the Philae temple complex (on Agilkia Island, from Greco-Roman period), Qubbet el-Hawa (Old and Middle Kingdom Tombs), the ruins of the town of Elephantine, stone quarries and an unfinished obelisk, the Monastery of St. Simeon, and the Fatimid Cemetery.
Historic Cairo	A look at the city with numerous historic buildings	Cairo	1979	89; i, v, vi (cultural)	Cairo was founded as the seat of the Fatimid Caliphate in the 10th century on the site of earlier cities. It was a major city during and after the Islamic Golden Age, with scholars, scientists, medical doctors, artists, writers, and traders living there or visiting. Construction shifted to other parts of the city in the 19th century, leaving the historical part preserved, although in the 21st century the area suffers from deterioration of the traditional urban fabric, neglect and lack of maintenance, and overcrowding. Historic Cairo features ensembles of Tulunid, Fatimid, and Mamluk buildings, including the Mosque of Ibn Tulun from the 8th century, numerous shrines, madrasas, hammams, and fountains.
Abu Mena	Ancient ruins with parts of pillars on the ground	Alexandria	1979	90; iv (cultural)	The Early Christian centre developed around the tomb of Menas of Alexandria, who died in 296. The site was a pilgrimage centre in classical antiquity and remained important for the Coptic community in the following centuries. The archaeological site comprises a church, a baptistery, basilicas, public buildings, streets, monasteries, houses, and workshops. The main buildings were constructed in ashlar limestone while simple houses were in mudbrick. From 2001 to 2025, the site was listed as endangered because the rising water table was decreasing the stability of the clay-based soils, resulting in threats to structural integrity of the monuments. The situation has improved by 2024.
Saint Catherine Area	A monastery with high walls in a mountain desert area	South Sinai	2002	954; i, iii, iv, vi (cultural)	The Orthodox monastery of Saint Catherine was founded in the 6th century and is the oldest functioning Christian monastery. It was built at the site of what is traditionally believed to be Mount Horeb – the place where, according to the Old Testament, Moses received the Tablets of the Law. The region is sacred for Christians, Muslims and Jews. The monastery hosts exceptional examples of Byzantine art, as well as collections of manuscripts.
Wadi Al-Hitan (Whale Valley)	Fossil whale bones exposed on the ground, protected by a fence	Faiyum	2005	1186; viii (cultural)	Wadi Al-Hitan is the most important fossil site to the study of the evolution of cetaceans from terrestrial to marine mammals. Excavations have uncovered numerous often complete fossils of the earliest order of whales, archaeoceti, in the last stages of losing their hind limbs. The site also provides clues about the environment these animals lived in.

== Tentative list ==
In addition to sites inscribed on the World Heritage List, member states can maintain a list of tentative sites that they may consider for nomination. Nominations for the World Heritage List are only accepted if the site was previously listed on the tentative list. Egypt maintains 34 properties on its tentative list.

Tentative sites
Site	Image	Location (governorate)	Year listed	UNESCO criteria	Description
Siwa archaeological area	Look at an oasis from above	Matrouh	1994	(cultural)	Siwa Oasis contains several archaeological sites, including the oracle temple of Amun.
Temple of Serabit Khadem	Temple ruins with several standing stones	South Sinai	1994	(cultural)	This nomination comprises the Temple of Serabit Khadem and Saint Catherine's Monastery. The latter was listed as a World Heritage Site in 2002.
North Sinai Archaeological Sites Zone		North Sinai	1994	(cultural)	The land bridge between Egypt and Canaan has been an important route for military expeditions in both directions through history. It comprises a collection of ancient sites between the Suez Canal and Gaza along the Mediterranean coast.
Temple of Hator built by Ramses III			1994	(cultural)	No information provided in the nomination documentation.
Dahshour archaeological area	A bent pyramid	Giza	1994	(cultural)	Dahshur was a part of the Memphite Necropolis that has been listed as a World Heritage Site since 1979. It was first used by Sneferu of the Fourth Dynasty, who constructed the Bent Pyramid (pictured). It was later used by the pharaohs of the Middle Kingdom.
El Fayoum	Ruins in a desert	Faiyum	1994	(cultural)	This nomination comprises eight sites, including Kom Aushim (Karanis), Dimai (Soknopaiou Nesos, pictured), Qasr Qarun (Dionysias), Batn I hrit (Theadelphia), and Byahma-Medinet el Fayoum.
El-Gendi Fortress		South Sinai	1994	(cultural)	The fortress was constructed under Saladin in 1183 on a mountain at a height of 2,150 m (7,050 ft). It has several towers, two mosques, and rooms for soldiers.
Rutho Monastery		South Sinai	1994	(cultural)	Rutho Monastery was constructed in the 6th century. Its ruins were discovered in 1984. The complex contained two basilicas, an oil press, and rooms for monks. It was surrounded by defensive walls.
Wadi Feiran		South Sinai	1994	(cultural)	The Feiran Oasis has remains of old monasteries and churches, as well as rocks with Nabataean inscriptions.
Pharaon Island	An old fortress on an island	South Sinai	1994	(cultural)	The island is situated on a strategic location in the Gulf of Aqaba. It has structures from different periods, including a fortress built under Saladin to protect the trade routes.
Dahab		South Sinai	1994	(cultural)	In Dahab, there are remains of a Byzantine lighthouse and remains of a settlement from the 5th and 6th centuries.
Minia	Remains of a tomb in a desert setting	Minya	1994	(cultural)	This nomination comprises the tombs of Beni Hasan, tombs of Tell El-Amarna, Hermopolis, and Tuna El-Gebel sites (pictured).
Newibah castle		South Sinai	1994	(cultural)	The castle from 1893 was constructed on the site of an older castle from the Ayyubid period.
Ras Mohammed	Underwater photo of a coral reef	South Sinai	2002	vii, viii, ix, x (natural)	The area comprises desert on land and a marine habitat with coral reefs rich in animal species. There are also sites with fossil corals.
Gebel Qatrani Area, Lake Qaroun Nature Reserve	View at a lake surface	Faiyum	2003	(mixed)	The quarries around Lake Qaroun (on the site of the ancient Lake Moeris) were already in use in the Predynastic period (4th millennium BCE) and stone from here was used in temples of the Old Kingdom. Excavations have also uncovered Neolithic stone tools and remains of an ancient proboscidean, Moeritherium.
Southern and Smaller Oases, the Western Desert	Oasis with buildings and palm trees and desert in the background	Beheira, Matrouh, New Valley	2003	vii, viii, ix, x (natural)	This nomination comprises five sites in the Western Desert: Kharga Oasis, Dakhla Oasis (pictured), Moghra Oasis, Dunqul Oasis, and the Wadi El Natrun depression. These sites have been inhabited since ancient times. People grow date palms, olives, fruit trees, as well as some cereals. There are several xerophytic and halophytic plant species. The area is also home to the dorcas gazelle.
Bird Migration Routes	A lake with some dummy birds on for hunting purposes	Aswan, North Sinai, Red Sea	2003	vii, x (natural)	This nomination comprises five sites: Lake Bardawil (pictured) and Zaranik on the Mediterranean coast, the Gabal Sha'ib El Banat area on the Red Sea coast, and Saluga and Ghazal Islands and the Lake Nasser on the Nile. These sites are important stopovers for migratory birds, as well as for the resident ones.
Desert Wadis	Dry area with some shrubs and water in the background	Aswan, Red Sea	2003	vii, viii, ix, x (natural)	This nomination comprises three desert wadis: Wadi Allaqi, Wadi El Gemal, and Wadi Qena. They were river valleys during the humid periods. They are nominated due to historical remains spanning from prehistory to Roman Egypt, as well as biodiversity. El Gemal (pictured) is located at the Red Sea coast and is an important stopover for migratory birds, a nesting site for green turtles, and a habitat for dugongs.
Mountain Chains	Desert setting with a plateau with steep slopes	Aswan, New Valley, Red Sea	2003	vii, viii, ix, x (natural)	This nomination comprises five areas with mountain chains that reach at some points above 2,000 m (6,600 ft). They are nominated due to the geological formations they exhibit, their plant and animal life, and some sites have prehistoric petroglyphs. Gilf Kebir is pictured.
Great Desert Landscapes	Sand dunes in a desert	Beni Suef, Matrouh	2003	vii, viii, ix (natural)	This nomination comprises three sites: the Qattara Depression, a depression with various geomorphological land formations, the Great Sand Sea (pictured), which is a vast expanse of sandy dunes, and the Sannur Cave area, where alabaster was mined in ancient times.
Alexandria, ancient remains and the new library	An ancient pillar and a sphinx statue among ruins	Alexandria	2003	i, ii, vi (cultural)	Alexandria was founded in 332 BCE by Alexander the Great and was an important centre of arts and learning in classical antiquity, with famous structures such as the Lighthouse of Alexandria and the Great Library. The existing monuments include Pompey's Pillar (pictured), Serapeum, several tombs, and underwater remains. A new modern library was inaugurated in 2002.
Abydos, city of pilgrimage of the Pharaohs	Temple ruins	Sohag	2003	iv, vi (cultural)	Abydos was declared the city of Osiris, god of the afterlife, under Intef II of the Eleventh Dynasty. Due to its significance as a cult site, numerous pharaohs visited the city and constructed temples there, including Seti I and Ramesses II (temple pictured). There are necropolises from various periods around the city.
Pharaonic temples in Upper Egypt from the Ptolemaic and Roman periods	Ancient temple with several columns	Aswan, Luxor, Qena	2003	iv (cultural)	This nomination comprises four temples that were built in the Ptolemaic and Roman periods, with some incorporating components of earlier structures. The temples are the Dendera Temple complex (Temple of Hathor pictured), Temple of Kom Ombo, Khnum Temple in Esna, and the Temple of Edfu.
Necropolises of Middle Egypt, from the Middle Empire to the Roman period	Exterior view of ancient tombs in a desert setting	Minya	2003	ii, iii, vi (cultural)	This nomination comprises the tombs of Beni Hasan (pictured), tombs of Tell El-Amarna, Hermopolis, and Tuna El-Gebel sites. They date from the Middle Kingdom to the Roman period. Many tombs are decorated with paintings, carvings, and statues.
Raoudha nilometre in Cairo	Inside a building, steps leading down in a shaft to measure water level	Cairo	2003	i, iv (cultural)	A nilometer was a structure for measuring the Nile River's clarity and water level during the annual flood season. The structure on Roda Island dates to the early 8th century and was renovated several times. It has a three-storey well and a marble pillar to monitor the water level.
The monasteries of the Arab Desert and Wadi Natrun	A monastery in a desert setting	Beheira, Suez	2003	ii, iv, v (cultural)	This nomination comprises two groups of Coptic Orthodox monasteries, one group in Wadi El Natrun and the other in the Eastern Desert. The oldest one is the Monastery of Saint Anthony, associated with the monk Saint Anthony, one of the founders of Christian monasticism at the end of the 3rd century. Other monasteries include those of Saint Paul the Anchorite, Saint Pishoy, Saint Macarius the Great, and Saint Mary Deipara (pictured).
Two citadels in Sinai from the Saladin period (Al-Gundi and Pharaoh's island)	Medieval castle with a flag of Egypt, sea in the background	South Sinai	2003	iv, vi (cultural)	The two fortresses, one in Al-Gundi and the other one on the Pharaoh's Island (pictured), were constructed in the 12th century under Saladin. They were strategic forts during the Crusades but lost importance after 1291. Parts of the forts have been well preserved.
The An-Nakhl fortress, a stage on the pilgrimage route to Mecca	Historical photo of a fortress in a desert setting	North Sinai	2003	iii, iv, vi (cultural)	The fortress was constructed under Al-Ashraf Qansuh al-Ghuri in the early 16th century and it was used until the end of the 19th century. It was used as a stopover for pilgrims undertaking Hajj on the way to Mecca. It provided the pilgrims a place to rest, food, and drinking water.
Oasis of Fayoum, hydraulic remains and ancient cultural landscapes	Oasis with palm trees	Faiyum	2003	i, iv, v (cultural)	Faiyum Oasis has been inhabited since prehistoric times and was one of the first areas of Northern Egypt where agriculture was practiced. There used to be a large lake in the antiquity. Water management works in the area started under the Twelfth Dynasty and the oasis saw the greatest prosperity in the Greco-Roman period when it was one of Egypt's richest agricultural areas.
Historic quarters and monuments of Rosetta/Rachid	Remmains of a fortress wall	Beheira	2003	ii, iv, v (cultural)	Located in the Nile Delta, Rosetta was usually overshadowed by the bigger Alexandria but it flourished following the Ottoman conquest of Egypt in 1517. It again declined in the 19th century with the construction of Suez Canal. There are some historical buildings in the city, as well as Fort Julien (walls pictured), built by Qaitbay in 1479, where the Rosetta Stone was discovered in 1799.
Dababiya	Desert rock formation	Luxor	2008	viii (natural)	Dababiya is a geological site covering the period from upper Paleocene to lower Eocene, including the period around the Paleocene–Eocene Thermal Maximum. It covers layers of marine sediments with different species of foraminiferae. The GSSP point for the beginning of the Ypresian stage is defined at Dababiya.
Helwan Observatory	A historical photo depicting the observatory from above, with the word OBSERVATORY written on it	Cairo	2010	ii, vi, vii (mixed)	The astronomical observatory at Helwan (a historical photograph pictured) was constructed in 1903 to host a 30-inch reflecting telescope, the first large telescope in Africa. It was used to study Halley's Comet, galaxies, and, for religious purposes, the movements of the sun, the moon, and Sirius.
Kharga Oasis and the Small Southern Oases	Ancient ruins with arches in a desert setting	New Valley	2015	i, ii, iii, iv, v, vii, viii, ix, x (mixed)	This site comprises the Kharga Oasis and two other sites, the Dungul & Kurkur and Nabta Playa. These sites have been inhabited since prehistory but the majority of archaeological sites are from the Late Roman period. The remains include fortresses, a Christian cemetery of Bagawat (pictured), and irrigating systems with subterranean aqueducts. There are several xerophytic and halophytic plant species. The area is also home to the dorcas gazelle. Parts of this nomination have already been nominated in 2003.
Egyptian Museum in Cairo	A view at the red museum building from above	Cairo	2021	iv, vi (cultural)	The museum was designed by the French architect Marcel Dourgnon as an entry to the 1895 competition to construct a museum to host the vast collection of antiquities. The Beaux-Arts building was the first purpose-built museum in the region and influenced the designs of other museums. Due to its collections, it is the centre of Egyptology.

== See also ==
- List of Intangible Cultural Heritage elements in Egypt
- Tourism in Egypt
