= Sath El-Hadid Formation =

Geologic formation in Egypt

The Sath El-Hadid Formation, translating to "Iron Surface" in Arabic "سطح الحديد", is a geological formation in Egypt characterized by a nummulitic limestone bank containing large and small Nummulites. Introduced into the stratigraphy of the south Fayum area by Iskander in 1943, this formation is significant in the middle Eocene (Bartonian).

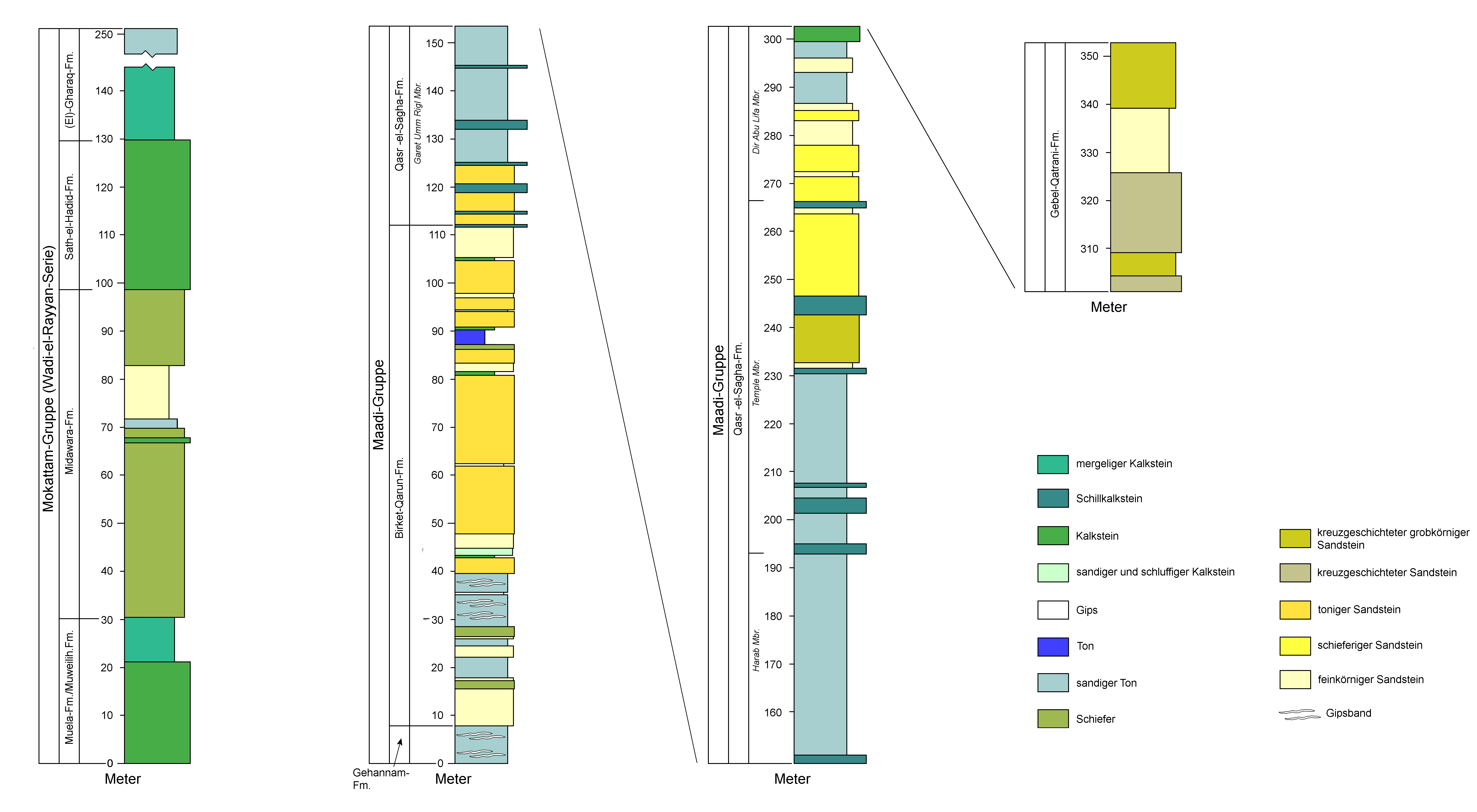
Geological section Wadi al-Hitan

== Stratigraphy and composition ==
The Sath El-Hadid Formation is approximately 25 meters thick and overlays the Midawara Formation. It is prominent in the Wadi El Rayan area, capping many mesas. The base of the formation is marked by a contact between the snow-white Sath El-Hadid limestone and the brown sandy limestone of the Midawara Formation. The upper contact with the El Gharag Formation is indicated by the emergence of brown and light brown shales above the nummulitic limestone.

Distinctive features of the Sath El-Hadid Formation include secondary flint concretions at the top and a gradual transition at the lower contact in the type section (Gebel Sath El-Hadid section). This gradual transition is characterized by the basal marly bryozoan limestone of the Sath El-Hadid and the uppermost glauconitic sandy yellow limestone of the Midawara Formation, with no evidence of an unconformity surface or hiatus.

== Age and fossil content ==
Based on stratigraphic position and the identified zone E13 Morozovelloides crassatus, the Sath El-Hadid Formation is dated to the middle Eocene (Bartonian). This formation is notable for the discovery of the holotype of the basilosaurid whale Tutcetus wadii, the smallest basilosaurid whale ever found. This fossil was located in an indurated limestone block near the Upper Lake in the Wadi El-Rayan area, approximately 40 km northeast of the Wadi El-Hitan World Heritage Site, several meters above the Midawara Formation.

The nummulitic limestone in the Sath El-Hadid Formation features varying sizes of Nummulites and is prevalent across several mesas in the Wadi El-Rayan area. Besides Tutcetus, the formation has yielded other vertebrate fossils, including sirenians and selachian fish.
