= Egyptian Protectorates =

Nature reserves in Egypt

Law 102 of 1983 empowered the Prime Minister of Egypt to designate certain areas to be declared as protectorates (nature reserves). A Prime Minister's decree defines the limits of each protected area and sets the basic principles for its management and for the preservation of its resources. Twenty-four protectorates have been declared so far. Note that these are completely unrelated to colonial "protectorates".

== Protectorates declared in the framework of Law 102 of year 1983 ==
	Protectorate Name	Declaration	Area (km^{2})	Governorate	P.M. Decree	Coordinates
1	Ras Muhammad National Park	1983	850	South Sinai	1068/1983 and 2035/1996	27.7222°N 34.2539°E
2	Nabaq Protectorate	1992	600	South Sinai	1511/1992 and 33/1996	28°16′41″N 34°22′48″E
3	Abu Galum Protectorate near Taba	1992	500	South Sinai	1511/1992 and 33/1996	28°52′25″N 34°27′31″E
4	Taba Protectorate	1998	3595	South Sinai	316/1998	29°30′N 34°53′E
5	Saint Kathrine National Park	1988	5750	South Sinai	613/1988 and 940/1996	28°33′20″N 33°58′34″E
6	Ahrash Protectorate near Rafah	1985	8	North Sinai	1429/1985 and 3379/1996	31°17′31″N 34°13′13″E
7	Azzaraniq Protectorate near Arish	1985	230	North Sinai	1429/1985 and 3379/1996	31°06′00″N 33°26′31″E
8	Ashtum El Gamil Protectorate	1988	180	Port Said	459/1988 and 2780/1998	31°15′35″N 32°09′34″E
9	Omayed	1986	700	Matrouh	671/1986 and 3276/1996	30°49′05″N 29°09′44″E
10	Petrified Forest Protectorate	1989	7	Cairo	944/1989	29°58′49″N 31°27′27″E
11	El Hassana Dome Protectorate	1989	1	Giza	946/1989	30°01′38″N 31°03′44″E
12	Lake Qarun Protectorate	1989	250	Faiyum	943/1989 and 2954/1997	29°27′13″N 30°34′51″E
13	Wadi Elrayan Protectorate	1989	1225	Faiyum	943/1989 and 2954/1997	29°08′52″N 30°23′33″E
14	Sannur Valley Cave Protectorate	1992	12	Beni Suef	1204/1992 and 709/1997	28°37′23″N 31°17′11″E
15	Wadi el-Assuti Protectorate	1989	35	Asyut	942/11989 and 710/1997	27°12′44″N 31°20′21″E
16	Saluga and Ghazal Protectorate	1986	0.5	Aswan	928/1986	24°05′37″N 32°53′13″E
17	Wadi Allaqi Protectorate	1989	30000	Aswan	945/1989 and 2378/1996	20°20′N 32°40′E
18	Gabal Elba National Park	1986	35600	Red Sea	450/1986 and 642/1995	22°11′16″N 36°22′14″E
19	Lake Burullus Protectorate	1998	460	Kafr El Sheikh	1444/1998	31°29′N 30°52′E
20	Nile Islands Protectorates	1998	160	All Governorates on the Nile	1969/1998	29°59′03″N 31°13′35″E
21	Wadi Degla Protectorate	1999	60	Cairo	47/1999 and 3057/1999	29°57′34″N 31°19′54″E
22	Siwa Oasis	2002	7800	Matrouh	Decree 1219/2002	29°11′N 25°33′E
23	White Desert National Park	2002	3010	New Valley	1220/2002	27°03′30″N 27°58′12″E
24	Wadi el-Gemal National Park near Hamata	2003	7450	Red Sea	143/2003	24°17′10″N 35°22′45″E
25	Red Sea Northern Islands	2006	1991	Red Sea	1618/2006	
26	Gilf Kebir National Park	2007	48523	New Valley	10/2007	23°26′29″N 25°50′23″E
27	Dababiya	2007	1	Luxor	109/2007	25°30′17.8″N 32°31′41.44″E
28	El-Sallum	2007	383	Matrouh	533/2010	22°11′16″N 36°22′14″E
29	El-Wahat El-Bahreya	2010	109	New Valley	2656/2010	
30	Mount Kamel Meteor Protectorate	2012	20	New Valley	271/2012	22°11′16″N 36°22′14″E
