= Selima Oasis =

Sudanese oasis west of the Nile's Third Cataract

Coordinates: 21.366667°N 29.316667°E

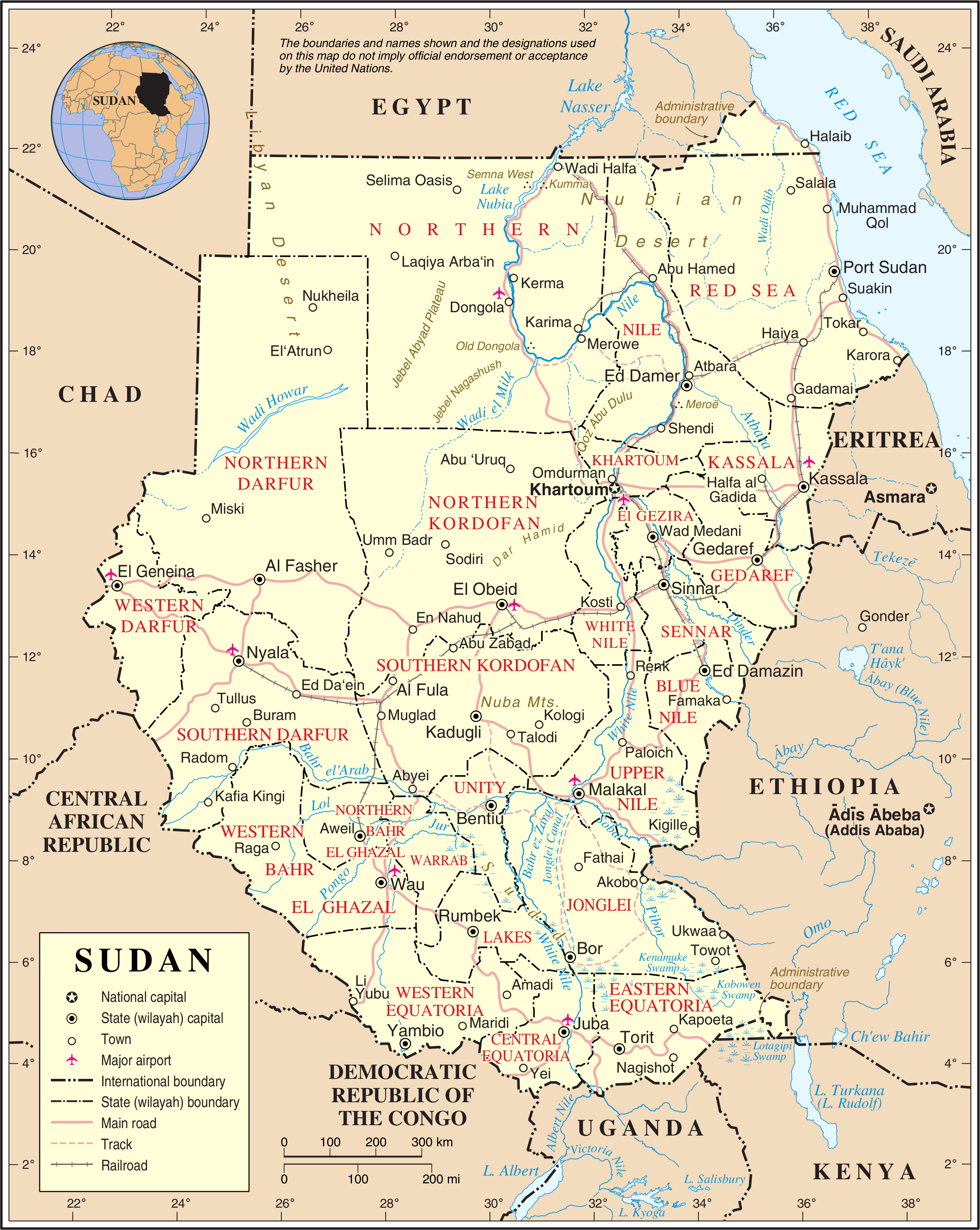
Map of Sudan showing Selima Oasis.

Selima Oasis is an oasis in the Sudan located 90 kilometres (56 mi) west of the Third Cataract of the Nile and the ancient site of Amara West. It lies along the Darb al-Arbaʿīn (Forty Days' Road), a desert track linking Kordofan with Egypt. Just to the north of Selima, the track splits into a northern route going to Kharga Oasis and a northwestern route going to Dunqul Oasis.

== Geography ==
Selima lies at the base of an escarpment of Jurassic and Cretaceous rock. Around 8300 BC, a freshwater lake formed over the site with depths of 3–10 metres (9.8–32.8 ft). The surrounding vegetation was savannah at the time. The remains of lacustrine fauna and of Palaeolithic artefacts have been recovered from the site. Around 4300, it transitioned to a saltwater sabkha and by 2700 it had dried up. Today it lies over the Nubian Sandstone Aquifer System.

The flora of Selima is not particularly varied and includes grasses (Desmostachya bipinnata and Imperata cylindrica), reeds (Phragmites australis), camelthorn (Alhagi maurorum), date palm (Phoenix dactylifera), dom palm (Hyphaene thebaica) and several species of tamarisk (Tamarix). Although upwards of 2500 date palms were counted in the oasis in 1902, just over 1000 were found in 2011. Dates have never been an important part of the economy of the oasis.

== History ==
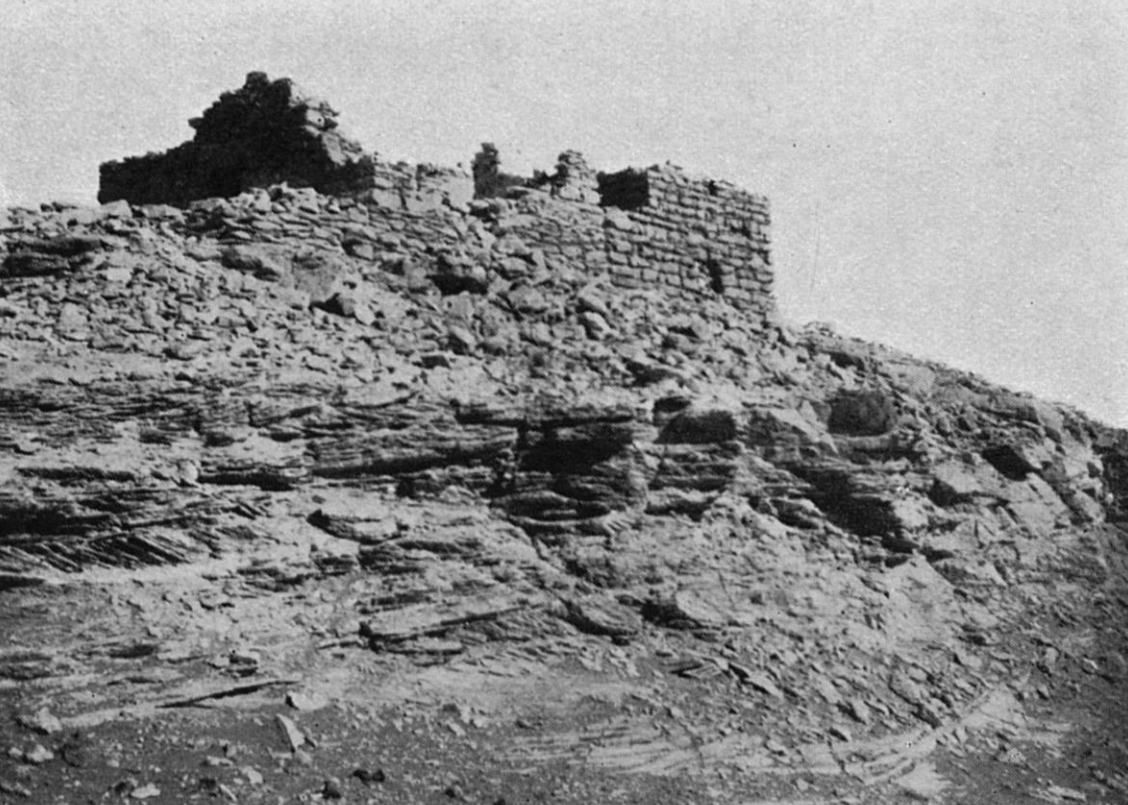
The Beit es-Selima, the ruins of a medieval structure.

Selima has been in use for millennia as a waypoint for travellers to bypass the Second Cataract. Pottery of the Mesolithic Early Khartoum culture has been found at Selima. The Egyptian official Harkhuf almost certainly used it on his trading missions to Kerma. Traveller's descriptions of the oasis date back to the 16th century and all describe the place as having easy access to water. Potable water is found 70–80 centimetres (2.3–2.6 ft) below the surface. In the early 19th century, Frédéric Cailliaud found three wells in use at Selima and three wells are still in use today. The archaeologist William Boyd Kennedy Shaw, who visited Selima during his circuit of the Libyan Desert in 1935, called it the "loveliest of all the Libyan oases". Only minor archaeological work was done at Selima in the 1970s and 1980s. The first major excavations were undertaken by the Selima Oasis Project in 2011, 2013 and 2014.

Atop a mound about 200 metres (660 ft) southeast of the oasis vegetation lies the Beit es-Selima, the ruins of an ancient multi-roomed stone structure. Carbon dating and potsherds put the building in use during the Nubian early (AD 600–850) and classical (AD 850–1100) Christian periods. Most pottery recovered was wheel-made and a few decorated pieces were from Aswan. Although not originally fortified, the building dominates the surrounding countryside and in the early 20th century was used a police watchtower or fort (tabia) by the Anglo-Egyptian administration. Theories about its purpose abound. It has been described as a tavern on the Darb al-Arbaʿīn managed by a warrior-princess named Selima and as a Christian convent. The Catholic missionary Theodor Krump described it as the ruins of an eight-celled monastery when he passed through in 1700. Support for this theory may come from the Ḥudūd al-ʿĀlam, a 10th-century Persian geography, which describes two monasteries as lying "in the desert between the Nuba and the Sudan".

On and around the Beit es-Selima are numerous inscriptions and engravings. These include writing in Arabic and Libyco-Berber, but not Greek or Coptic. Some signs might be camel brands or tribal markings. There are also a few figural engravings. They show that Selima was in contact with the Kharga Oasis, the Dakhla Oasis and the Darfur.

In 1928, the archaeologist Thomas Leach reported that salt was mined at Selima by groups who came by donkey and camel from Sukkot, Argo Island and the Mahas. The salt caravans followed a track from Sagiat el-Abd in the Nile valley. According to oral tradition recorded in the vicinity of the Dal Cataract in 2014, the last salt caravan took place in 1980.

Today there is a military post, a police office and a customs station at Selima. Most traffic passing through is going to or coming from Libya.
