= Lake El Rayan =

Lake in Wadi El Rayan, Egypt

- Interactive map of Lake El Rayan
- Location: Faiyum Governorate
- Coordinates: 29°11′50″N 30°24′30″E
- Type: Lake
- Basin countries: Egypt

Lake El Rayan is a lake located within the Wadi El Rayan Protected Area in Egypt. It covers an area of 52.9 square kilometers and consists of two lakes connected by a waterfall area. The lake is an important source of fish resources.

== Geography ==
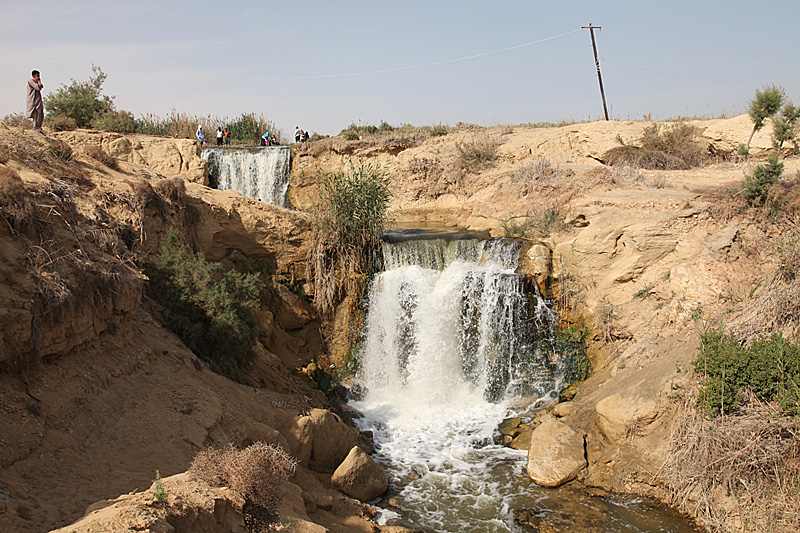
Waterfalls in El Rayan

Lake El Rayan is located in the southwestern region of the Fayoum Governorate, situated within the Western Desert. It is situated approximately 25 kilometers to the south of the city. Wadi El Rayan project commenced in October 1968, following an increase in the water level of Lake Qarun, which posed a threat to the infrastructure constructed around it. This infrastructure was designed to serve as a reservoir for agricultural drainage water in Fayoum. The project was concluded in January 1973, with the initial transfer of agricultural drainage water.

The project encompasses the construction of a 5.9-kilometer-long canal extending from the periphery of the governorate to the desert boundary. This is followed by the establishment of a covered canal measuring 5 kilometers in length and 3 meters in width at the Buqayrat Plateau, which ultimately discharges into the lake. It is estimated that approximately 200 million cubic meters of agricultural drainage water enters the Rayan depressions on an annual basis.

The lake is divided into two sections: an upper lake with an area of 50.90 square kilometers, a salinity of approximately 5.1 grams per liter, and a maximum depth of 22 meters; and a lower lake with an area of 6,200 hectares. The two lakes are connected by the waterfalls area, where the water level reaches up to 20 meters. This region is notable for its high fish density.

== Fishing industry ==
The waters of the Rayan depressions are classified as semi-fresh, with the majority of fish production comprising Nile fish. However, the mullet and bass families are transported to the lakes as fry from Egypt's coastal areas. The principal fish species observed in El-Rayan depressions include mullet, white tilapia, Zander, and carp bass.

There are five fish collection centers in the Rayan wetlands, three of which are located in the first depression and two in the third. The fishing season in the Rayan wetlands is approximately 200 days in duration. It is estimated that the seasonal production of the Rayan wetlands is approximately 1,100 to 1,200 tons of fish. The area is home to a solar-powered ice factory in Wadi El Rayan, which operates through photovoltaic cells. This factory is only operational during the fishing season in the Rayan wetlands and serves the fish marketing project in the governorate, as well as the Rayan and Qarun associations.

== Tourism ==
In addition to its function as a conduit for the disposal of agricultural wastewater, Lake El Rayan, situated within a verdant valley and surrounded by cascading waterfalls, represents a notable tourist destination. Furthermore, the region's biodiversity, exemplified by the presence of rare wildlife on Mount Rayan.

== See also ==
- List of lakes of Egypt
- Wadi El Rayan
- Faiyum
