= Darb El Arba'īn =

Trans-Saharan trade route

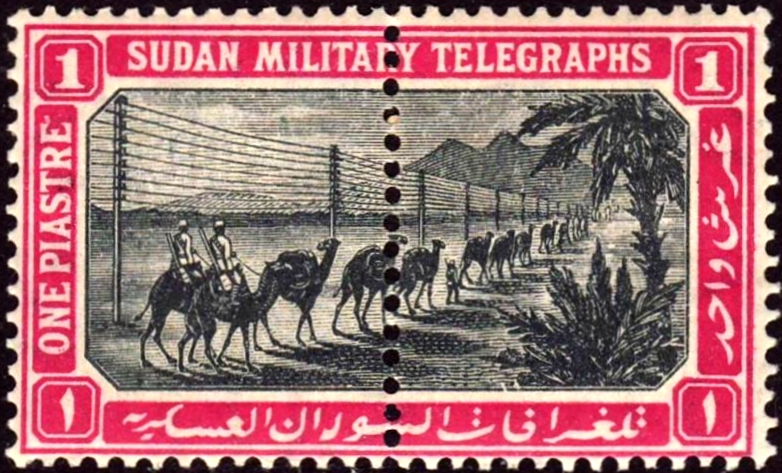
Sudanese telegraph stamp depicting camel caravan (1898)

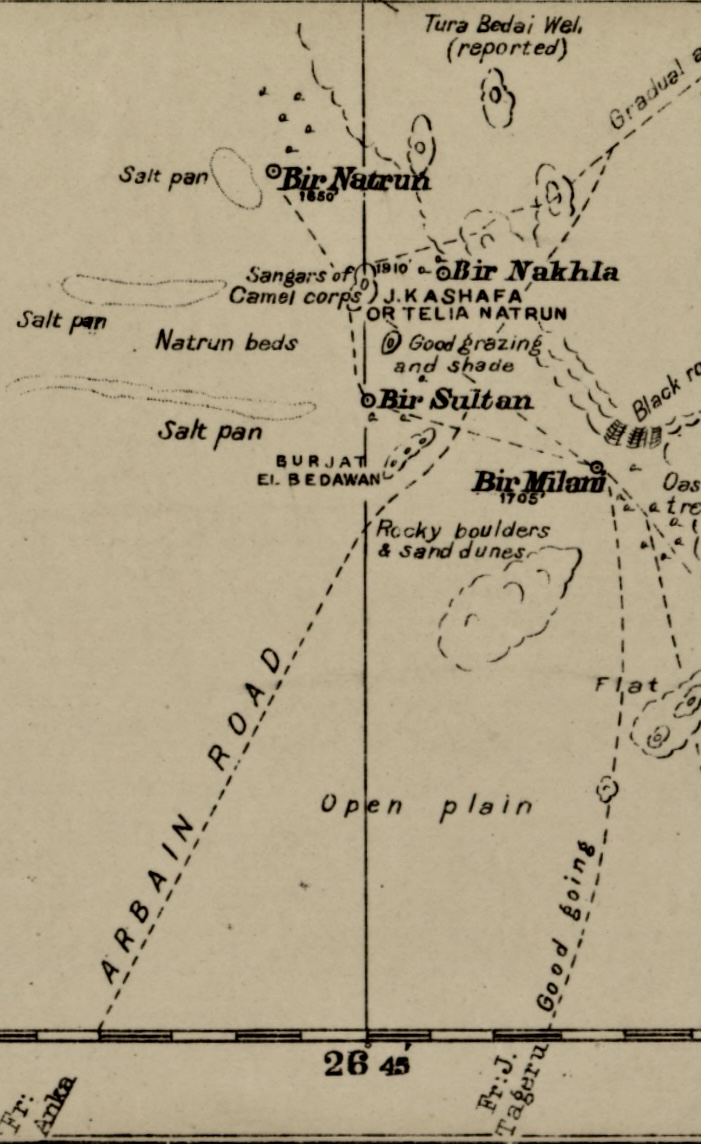
Map of Bir Natrun, a stop on the trade route that was known as a valuable source of rock salt (1925)

Darb El Arba'īn (Arabic: درب الاربعين) (also called the Forty Days Road, for the number of days the journey was said to take in antiquity) is the easternmost of the great north–south Trans-Saharan trade routes. The Darb El Arba'īn route was used to move trade goods, livestock (camels, donkeys, cattle, horses) and slaves via a chain of oases from the interior of Africa to portage on the Nile River and thence to the rest of the world.

The journey from what is now North Darfur, Sudan to what is now Asyut Governorate, Egypt is approximately 1,800 km (1,100 mi) and usually took closer to 60 days due to the need to rest and water the herd. Traveling by the desert route was more direct, less expensive and safer than the Nile route.

The desert between the Yellow Nile riverbed in north Sudan and the limestone plateau of Middle Egypt receives average annual precipitation of less than 5 mm a year "and a frequency of 30 to 40 years between significant rainfall events, [meaning] it is very likely the driest region on earth." The route is laid out so that water is always available within a two or three day's journey and "no single waterless stage of the route exceeds 280 km." Darb Al Arba'īn was the main north–south trade route in this part of Africa; a number of other transportation routes in the eastern Sahara went east–west, connecting the Nile settlements to the great oases of the Western Desert.

The route is still extant, now used to drive camel herds to the camel meat markets in Egypt; cars and trucks on asphalt roads are used in addition to camels and donkeys traveling over sand and rock.

== History ==
Modern archeologists studying the route have found watering stations, cairns (called alamat in Arabic and used as wayfinding markers), sherds, petroglyphs dating to the New Kingdom and the Roman era, and the bleached bones of camels and donkeys.

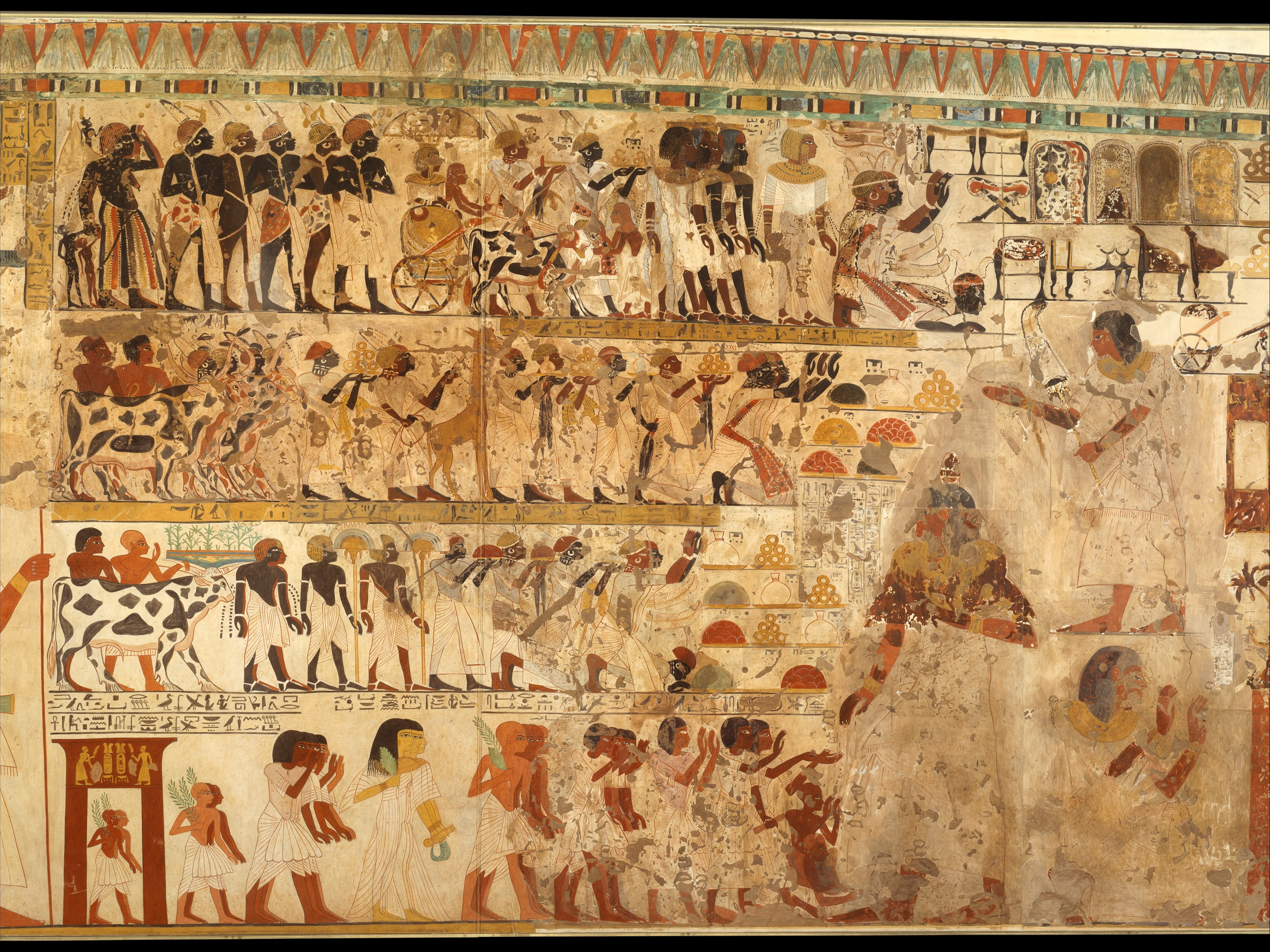
Viceroy of Kush Amenhotep called Huy receiving tribute from a Nubian embassy. c. 1332 – 1323 BC, TT40, Qurnet Murai, Luxor, Egypt

The route was likely extant at the time of the pharaohs, when donkeys would have been used for transportation. Dromedaries were added as pack animals in North Africa sometime between 500 BC and the first year of the Gregorian calendar.

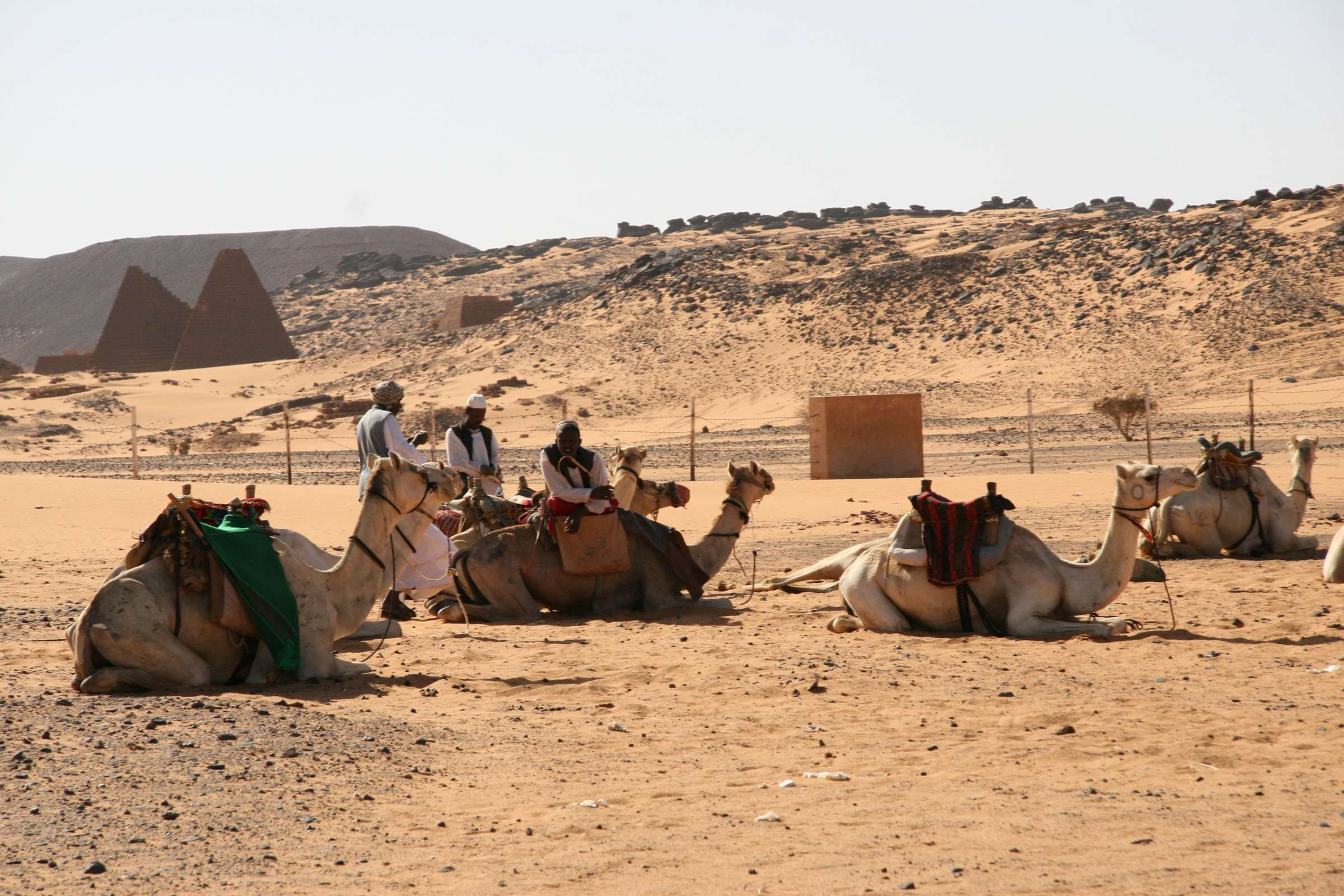
Camels in Darfur, Sudan (2008)

Herodotus mentioned the route in his writings, and the Romans established a chain of defenses to protect the route, such that "Darb El Arba'īn was the most favorable route for the long-running caravans from the 2nd century BC to the 4th century AD." Medieval traveler Ibn Hawqal wrote about the Forty Days Road in the 10th century. In 1793, William George Browne was the first Englishman to ride with the camel caravan and document his observations. The Frenchman Jacques-Charles Poncet traveled the route in 1698.

"Arrival at Kobbé ended for the traveller two months' journeying over a thousand of the most barren miles in Africa. The difficulties and trials of such travel are well summed up in the stiff language of the translator of Poncet's book. On leaving Kharga Oasis he says, ‘We were to pass thro' a Desart, where there was neither Brook nor Fountain. The Heat is so excessive, and the Sands of those Desarts so burning, that there is no marching bare-foot, without having one's Feet extremely Swell'd. Nevertheless, the nights are Cold enough, which occasions troublesome Distempers in those who Travel thro' that Country. Those vast Wildernesses, where there is neither to be found Bird, nor Wild Beast, nor Herbs, nor so much as a little Fly, and where nothing is to be seen but Mountains of Sand, and the Carcasses and Bones of Camels, Imprint a certain horrour in the Mind.'" —W.B.K. Shaw, quoting from the 1709 English translation of C.J. Poncet's A Voyage to Ethiopia in the Years 1698, 1699 and 1700

The use of the route for the transportation of slaves dates to ancient times and was reaffirmed by the Islamic conquest of North Africa. As early as the 8th century the Coptic writer Abu al-Bishr Severus reported that Muslims were kidnapping Nubians and selling them in Egypt. Three major caravans beginning in "Dar Fur, Sinnar and Fezzan" eventually served the coastal slave markets. By the 10th century, chroniclers reported the slaves were obtained from places "beyond" the Kordofan, Dar Fur and Bahr regions of "Nubia." A handful of European observers documented the route in the 18th century and estimated that between 3,000 and 12,000 slaves were trafficked along the route annually. The Sudanese slave trade was abolished and blockaded in the last decade of the 19th century by the Anglo-Egyptian government "thus bringing to a close a long chapter of suffering in the history of the peoples of East Bilad al-Sudan."

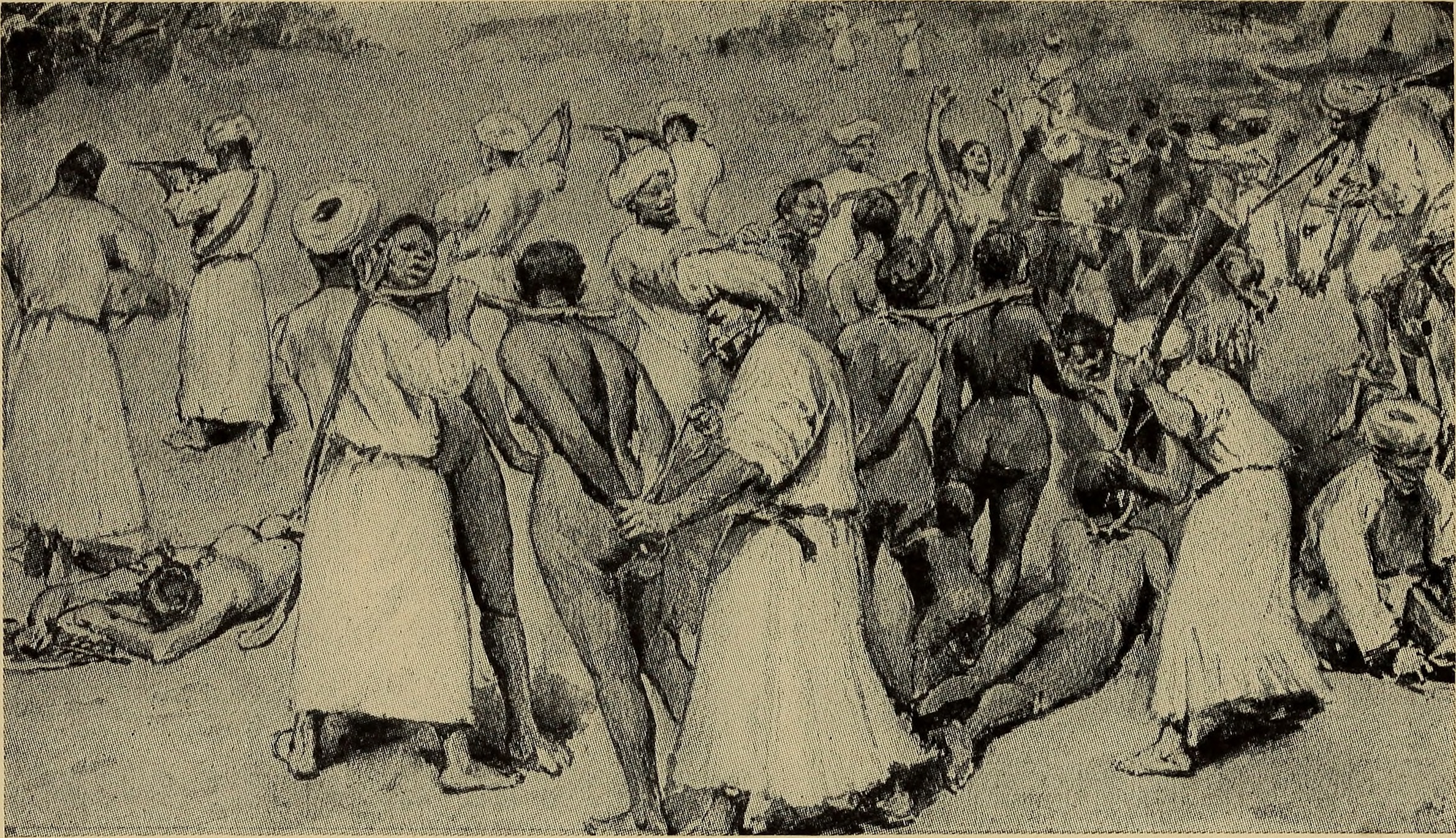
Illustration of 19th-century human trafficking in Sudan (1913)

The trade goods exchanged along the route via caravan included gold, copper, quartz, precious and semiprecious gemstones such as emeralds, faience, ebony, alabaster, natron, salt, alum, tamarinds, wheat, ivory (both elephant and hippopotamus), rhinoceros horn, ostrich eggs, ostrich feathers, civet, tar, aromatic oil, resin, incense, gum Arabic, Aleppo soap, senna leaves, lentils, rare vegetables, olive oil, vinegar, spices such as cloves, wine, "luxury" items, weapons, textiles, animal pelts, "exotic" live animals, and plants.

== Route ==
Notes on nomenclature: Bīr (Arabic: بئر) means water well. Wādī (Arabic: وَادِي) means river valley, although the stream of water may be temporarily or permanently absent.

Permanent settlements were rarely established around the oases of northern Sudan; the watering places were "only sporadically" used as military outposts.

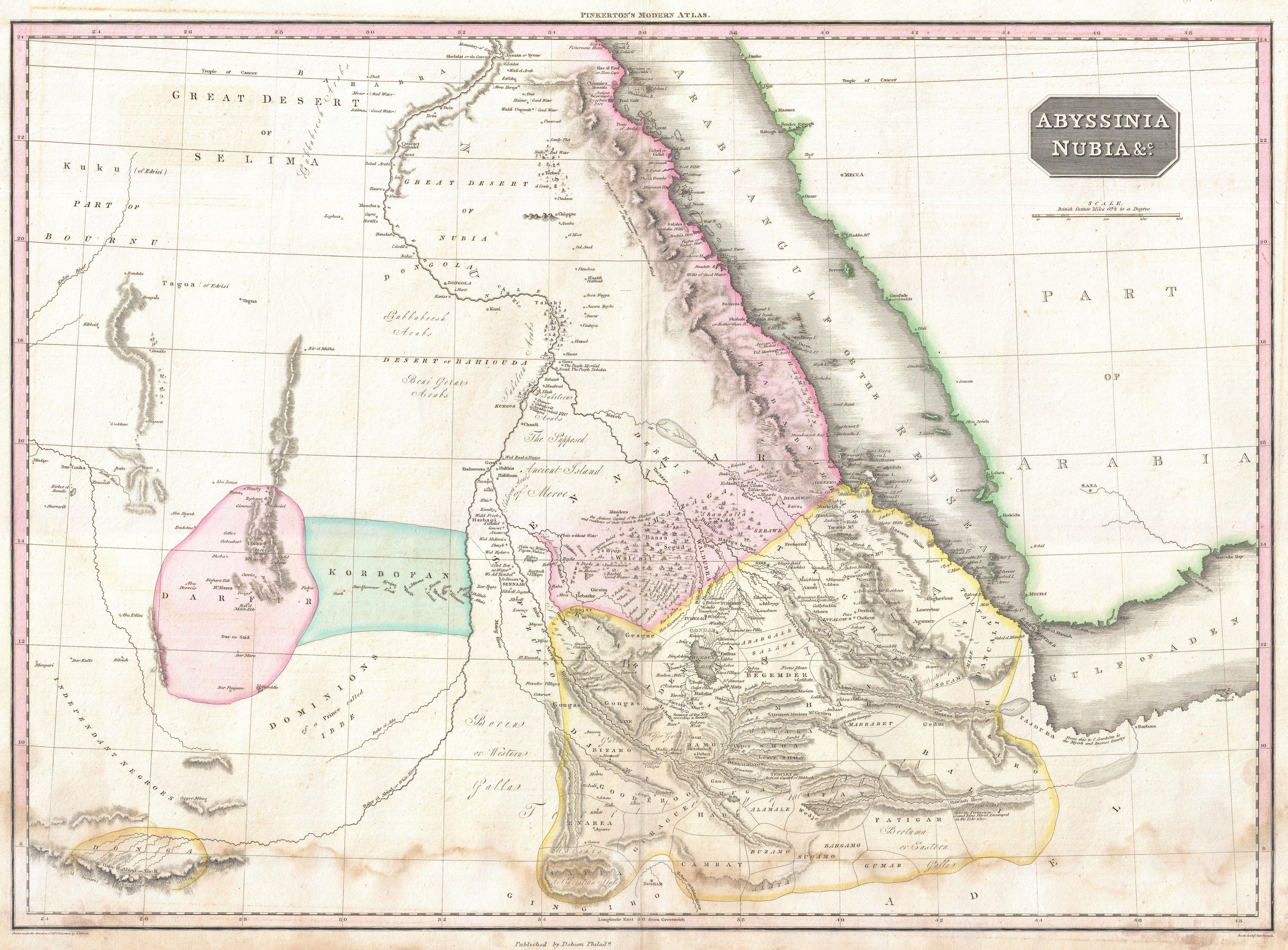
Southern terminus "Cobbe" is in the center of the mountains in the pink zone; the mapmaker notes that Selima has "good water" contra nearby Mour's "bad water" (1818)

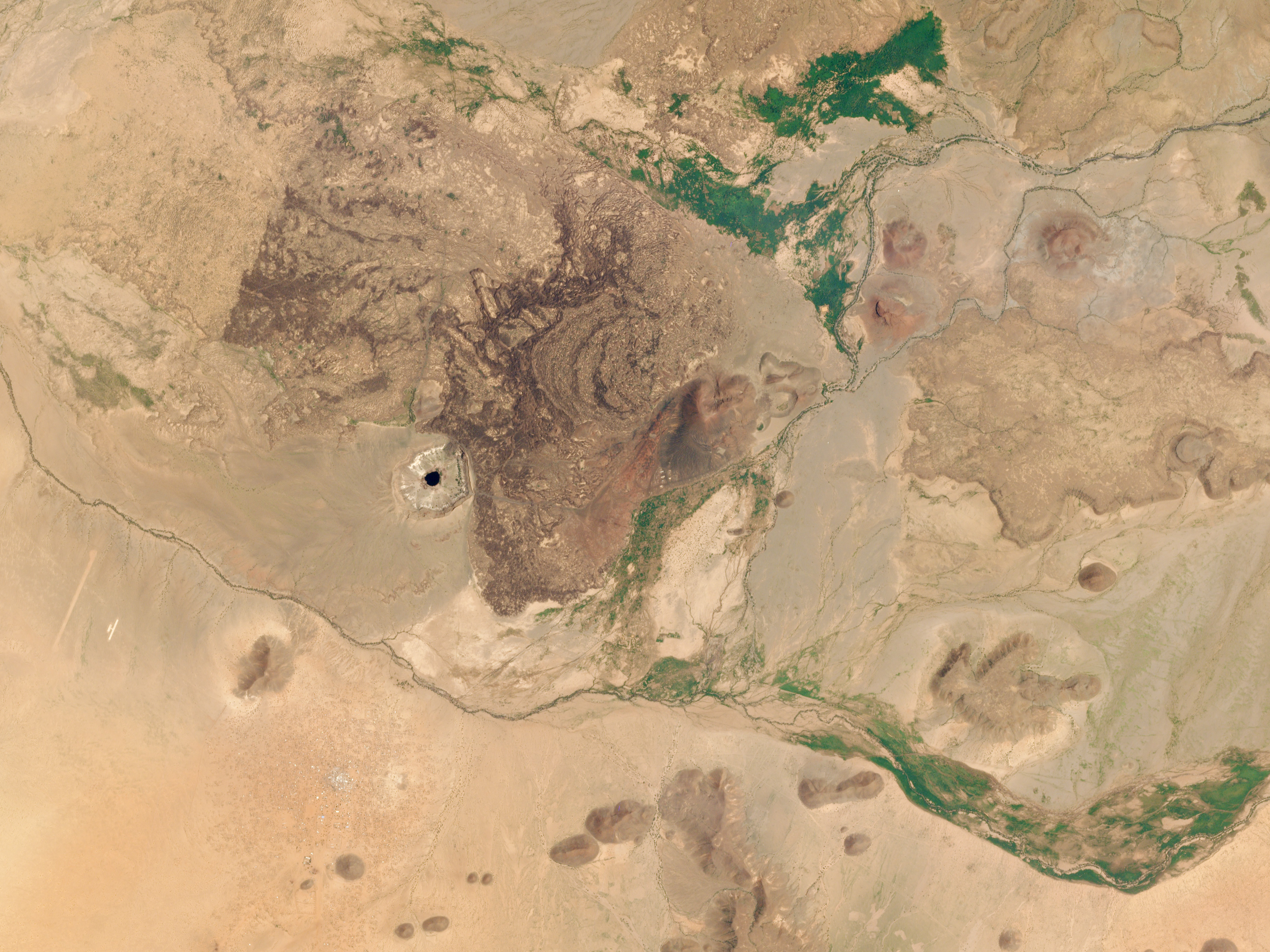
Aerial photograph of Malha Wells, water source along one of the two possible routes between Kobbei and Al-Atrun (2016)

The southern terminus of Darb El Arba'īn was Kobbei or Kabayh (Arabic: كتم) in Darfur, which was "once the chief city of western Sudan." (Kobbei is located about 40 km north of al-Fashir, the modern capital of North Darfur state.)

The caravans, sometimes thousands of camels strong, then passed through the desert by one of two possible routes, heading to Bir Natrun (Arabic: بئر النطرون). Bir Natrun was the most famous of the four wells in the vicinity of Al-Atrun. ("The uninhabited Sudanese oasis has a tiny palm grove and a meter-wide hole in the ground as a watering station").

The caravans would next traverse the Middle Wadi Howar (Arabic: وادي هور). Wadi Howar was said to be visible from 15 km away because of the "line of trees growing in its bed." A 1933 map of Anglo-Egyptian Sudan noted that wildlife-rich Wadi Howar was "much used by natives as a road from North West Darfur to Bir Natrun and Dongola."

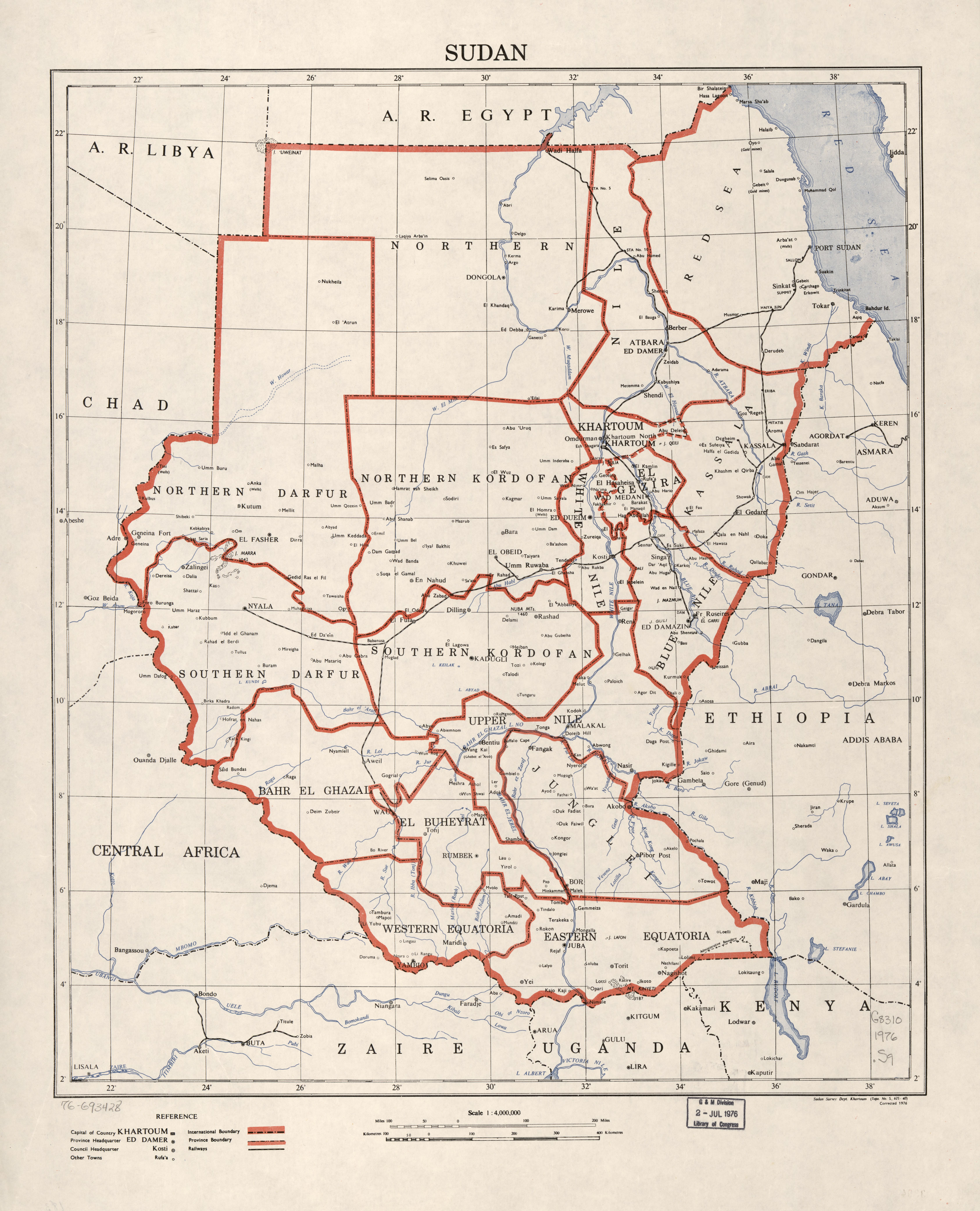
Middle Wadi Howar riverbed is visible on the left, in the center of Northern Darfur state (1976)

The next stops were Laqiya Arba'īn (archaic: Lagia or Leghea) and Selima Oasis or Wahat Salima, the last of the oases before what is now the Sudan-Egypt border.

Selima was a fork point where some southbound caravans turned southeast toward the Red Sea via the Sinnar-Shendi route, etc. A research team that visited Selima between 2011 and 2014 noted "how traces of the Darb El Arba'īn are still discernable, especially north of the oasis. Not only do bones and graves mark the road, but the tracks themselves are clearly visible." Wall carvings on an ancient building at the site are in "Arabic of several periods and Lybico-Berber scripts."

Northbound caravans hit an easier stretch with better water supplies between Al-Shab (Arabic: بئر الشب) and Kharga Oasis (Al Karja Arabic: الخارجة).

Finally, after navigating the Kharga Pass, the caravans would reach the Forty Days Road's northern terminus at the Nile city of Asyut, Egypt. Asyut was the gateway to commerce with Cairo and the entire Mediterranean Sea. The road from Kharga to Asyut is now Egypt's 60M highway.

=== Coordinates (listed roughly south to north) ===
- Kobbei, Darfur, Sudan 14.0666670°N 23.9666670°E
- Anka Wells 14.6833333°N 24.8500000°E
- Mahla Wells 15.1194100°N 26.1970500°E
- Bir Natrun, El-Atrun 18.2166700°N 26.6333300°E
- Middle Wadi Howar 17.2150019°N 26.3052543°E
- Laquia Arbain 20.0620590°N 28.0323030°E
- Selima Oasis 21.3666667°N 29.3166667°E
- Al-Shab 22.3124430°N 29.7375010°E
- Kharga Oasis 25.4390388°N 30.5586043°E
- Kharga Pass 25.948292°N 30.704181°E
- Asyut, Egypt 27.1783117°N 31.1859257°E

== See also ==
- Caravan (travelers)
- Caravanserrai
- Camel train
- Anglo-Egyptian Slave Trade Convention
