= William George Browne =

English explorer (1768–1813)

William George Browne (25 July 1768 – 1813) was an English traveller, whose journey took him through Egypt and parts of south-west Asia. He published a book of his travels in 1799. Browne was murdered while attempting to reach Tehran.

== Life ==
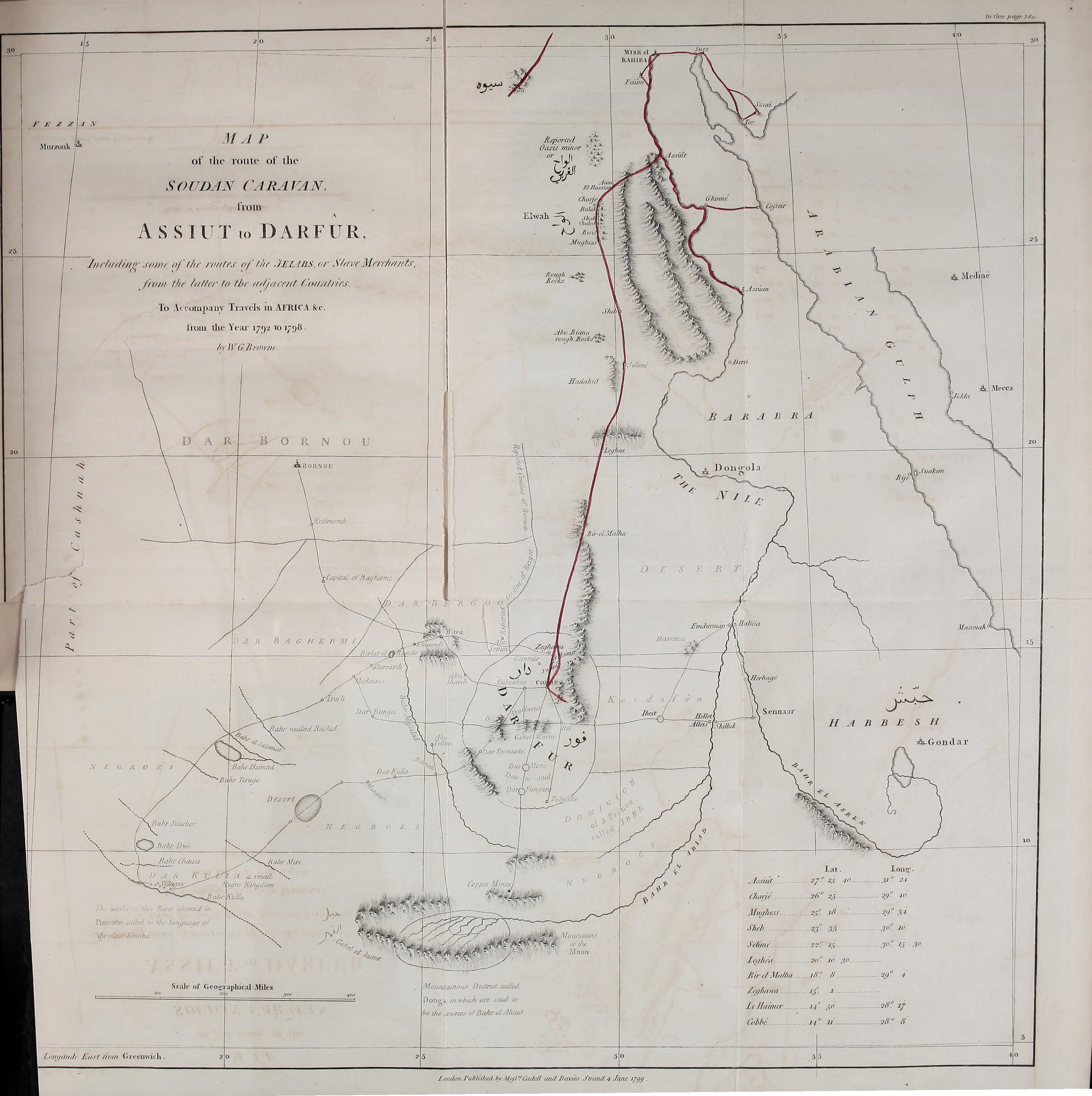
Map of the Darb El Arba'īn oasis route through Sudan and Egypt, based on Browne's reports (1799)

Browne was born at Great Tower Hill, London. At seventeen he was sent to Oriel College, Oxford. Having had a moderate inheritance left him by his father, on quitting the university he applied himself entirely to literary pursuits. But the fame of James Bruce's travels, and of the first discoveries made by the African Association, made him determined to become an explorer of Central Africa. He went first to Egypt, arriving at Alexandria in January 1792, where he studied Arabic. He spent some time in visiting the oasis of Siwa or Jupiter Ammon, and employed the remainder of the year in studying Arabic and in examining the ruins of Ancient Egypt.

In the spring of 1793 he visited Sinai, and in May set out for Darfur, joining the great Darb El Arba'īn caravan which every year went by the desert route from Egypt to Sudan. Many historians and ethnologists claim that Browne was "the first European to set foot in the region and the first to systematically collect material about it". Browne became "the first European to travel the whole length of the caravan route in 1793". He accompanied a camel caravan that traded jewellery, glass, silver and brass, sword-blades, fire-arms, carpets, cotton and cloth to Sudan. According to W. B. K. Shaw, this voyage as passing through "over a thousand of the most barren miles in Africa". This was his most important journey, in which he acquired a great variety of original information. He was forcibly detained by the sultan of Darfur and endured much hardship, being unable to effect his purpose of returning by Ethiopia (then known as Abyssinia). In 1796 he was, however, allowed to return to Egypt with a slave caravan consisting of about 500 camels. In September 1798, he returned to England through Syria and Constantinople.

In 1800 Browne again left England, and spent three years in visiting Greece, some parts of Asia Minor and Sicily. In 1812 he once more set out for the East, proposing to penetrate to Samarkand and survey the most interesting regions of central Asia. He spent the winter in Smyrna, and in the spring of 1813 travelled through Asia Minor and Armenia, made a short stay at Erzurum, and arrived on the 1 June at Tabriz. About the end of the summer of 1813 he left Tabriz for Tehran, intending to proceed further eastwards, but was shortly afterwards murdered. Some bones, believed to be his, were afterwards found and interred near the grave of Jean de Thévenot, the French traveller.

== Works ==
In 1799 Browne published his Travels in Africa, Egypt and Syria, from the years 1792 to 1798. While informative, the dry style of his book prevented it from becoming popular. His accounts were "unusual because he compared the customs of the people he visited favorably with those of Europe, a verdict that was not fashionable for this area and period".

Robert Walpole published, from papers left by Browne, an account of Browne's journey in 1802 through Asia Minor to Antioch and Cyprus in the second volume of his Memoirs relating to European and Asiatic Turkey (1820); also Remarks written at Constantinople (1802).
