= El-Gendi Fortress =

12th century fortress in the Sinai Peninsula, Egypt

Coordinates: 29.851260°N 33.130005°E

The El-Gendi Fortress (Arabic: قلعة الجندي) is located in the southern portion of the Sinai Peninsula, Egypt. Originally constructed at the behest of Saladin in 1183 AD, the large fortress includes defensive towers, mosques, residential structures, and the additional defensive fortification of ditches surrounding the site. The fortress is being considered for inclusion in the World Heritage list of sites with "outstanding universal value" to the world.

== World Heritage Status ==
This site was added to the UNESCO World Heritage Tentative List on November 1, 1994, in the Cultural category.
