= Qasr Qarun =

Archaeological site in Faiyum Governorate, Egypt

Coordinates: 29.40589519133047°N 30.41828622362407°E

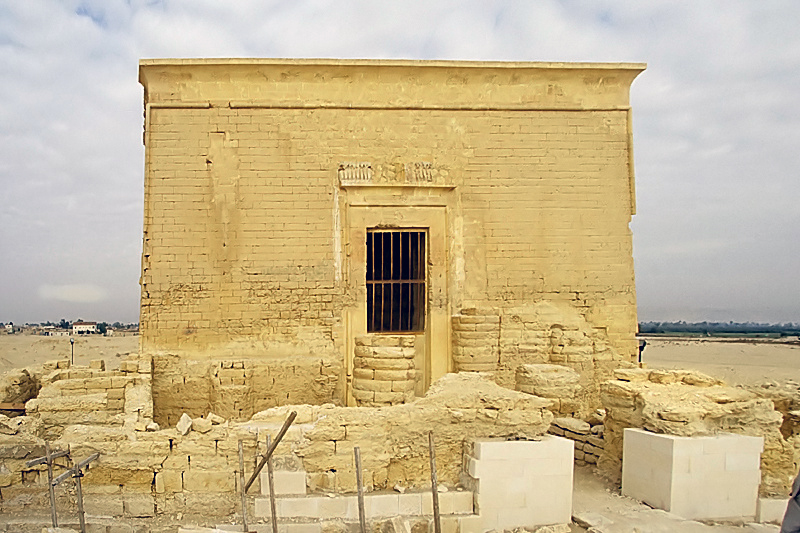
Temple of Qasr Qarun

Qasr Qarun is an archaeological site located near Lake Qarun in Faiyum Governorate, Egypt. The site primarily includes an ancient temple from the Ptolemaic period. It is located approximately 44 km (27 mi) from the city of Faiyum.

The temple was dedicated to the worship of the god Sobek and later Dionysus. From 330 BC to AD 640, the town was known as "Dionysias". The inhabitants of the region in the Islamic era called it "Qasr Qarun" because it was located near Lake Qarun.

The temple is known for its solar event which occurs annually on December 21, wherein the sun illuminates the inner sanctum.
