= Wadi El Rayan =

Nature reserve in Egypt

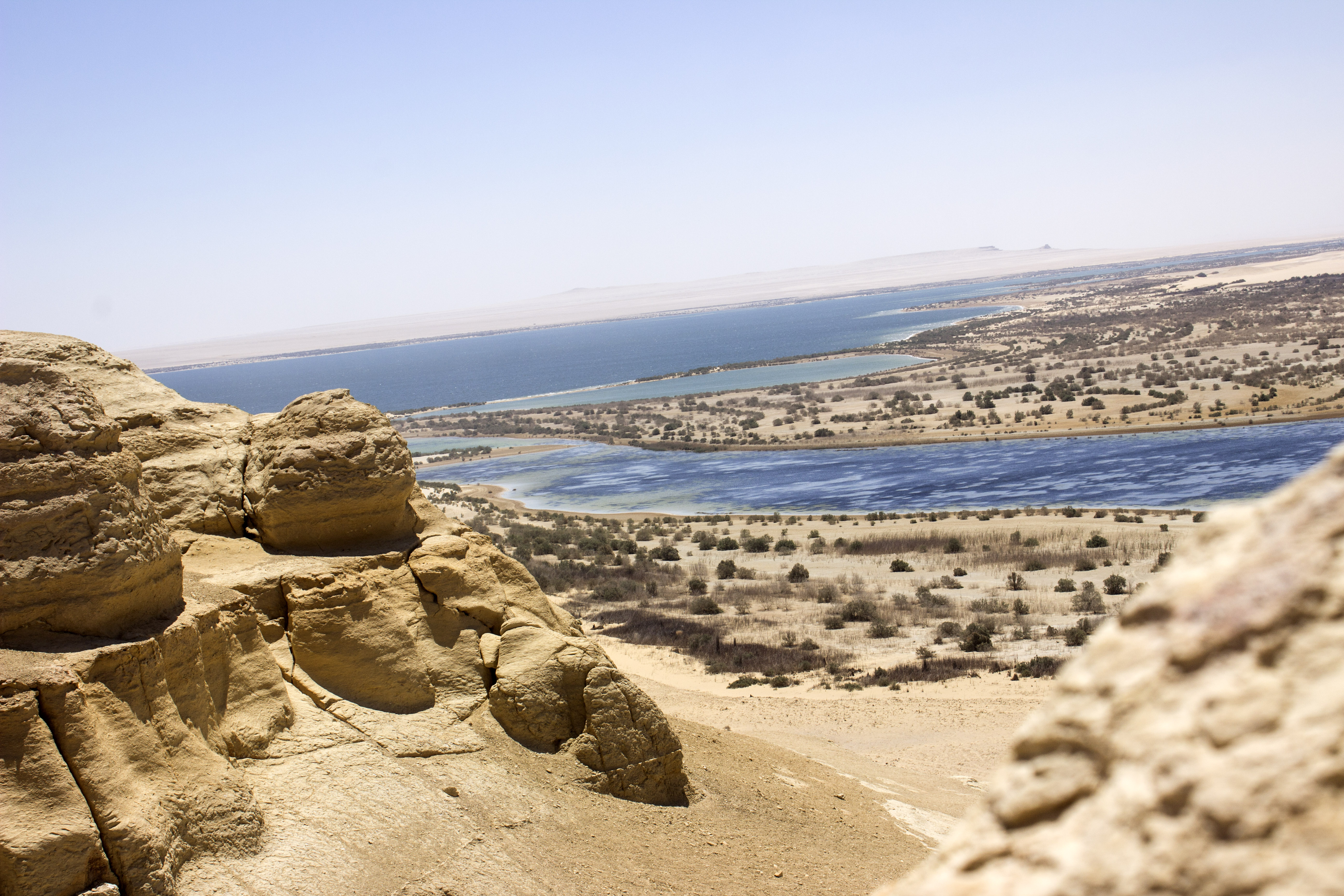
- Wadi El Rayan lake
- Interactive map of Wadi El Rayan
- Location: Faiyum Governorate, Egypt
- Coordinates: 29°08′52″N 30°23′33″E
- Area: 175,790 hectares (434,400 acres)

Ramsar Wetland
- Official name: Wadi El Rayan Protected Area
- Designated: 4 June 2012
- Reference no.: 2041

Wadi El Rayan is a unique nature protectorate in Faiyum Governorate, Egypt, under the supervision of the Ministry of Environmental Affairs (EEAA).

== History ==
Wadi el Rayan is mentioned in Coptic sources as Pilihēy (Coptic: ⲡⲓⲗⲓϩⲏⲩ, lit. 'possessing profit, useful'), a salt lake west of Kalamoun where Samuel the Confessor liked to rest.

== Geography ==
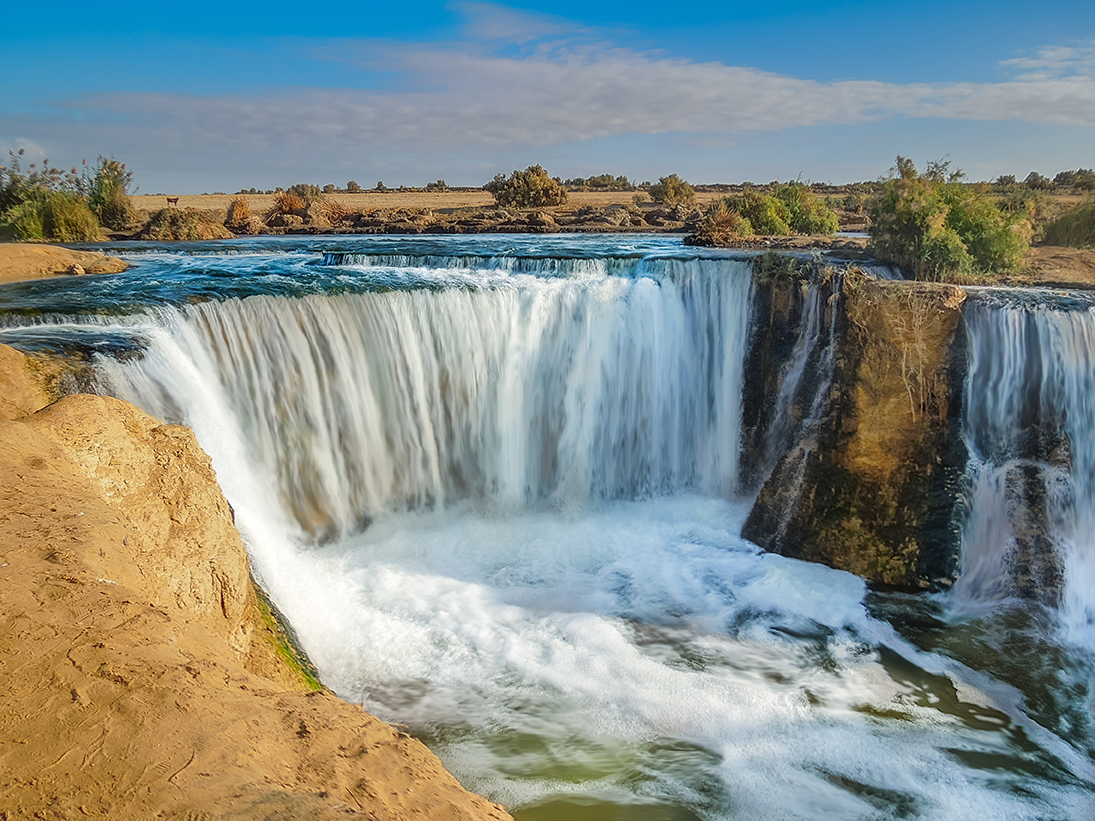
Waterfalls between upper and lower lakes in the Wadi el-Raiyan (Wadi el-Rayan), Egypt

The valley of Wadi El-Rayan is an area of 1,759 km^{2} (679 sq mi), 113 km^{2} (44 sq mi) of which are the dominating water body of the Wadi El Rayan lakes. It is located about 65 km (40 mi) southwest of Faiyum city and 80 km (50 mi) west of the Nile River. The Wadi has been used for man-made lakes from agricultural drainage which has made a reserve of the two separate Wadi El Rayan Lakes. The reserve is composed of a 50.90 km^{2} (19.65 sq mi) upper lake and a 62.00 km^{2} (23.94 sq mi) lower lake, with waterfalls between the two. Among the springs, there are three sulphur springs at the southern side of the lower lake, with extensive mobile sand dunes. Wadi El Rayan Waterfalls are considered to be the largest waterfalls in Egypt.

At the south and southeast of the springs is Gabal Manqueer Al Rayan, where marine fossils and archeological remains are found. Gabal Madwera, near the lower lake, is known for its extensive dune formations.

== Paleontology ==
In the northwest is Wadi El Hitan, a protectorate containing fossils of extinct whales including Tutcetus rayanensis, named after this area in 2023.

== Flora and fauna ==
The vegetation is confined to inter-dune areas around springs and at the base of large dunes. The vegetation cover is made of 13 species of perennial plants and a few individuals of Calligonum comosum and Zygophyllum album.

Wadi El Rayan accommodates one of the world's few remaining populations of the endangered slender-horned gazelle. The dorcas gazelle is still found in the area in small numbers whilst both the fennec fox and Rüppell's fox are scarce. There are 11 species of reptile, 9 species of mammal, 13 species of resident bird and 26 species of migrant and vagrant bird.

== See also ==
- Bahr Yussef
- Crocodilopolis
- Faiyum
- Lake El Rayan
- Fayum alphabet
- Faiyum Governorate
- Faiyum mummy portraits
- Lake Moeris
- Roman Egypt
