= Sannur Cave =

Large karst cave in Egypt

Coordinates: 28°37′23″N 31°17′11″E

Sannur Cave is a visually dynamic karst-based subterranean environment, made from groundwater traveling inside the Eocene-era limestone of Galala Plateau, Egypt. The Sunnur area is dated at approximately 65-million years, and is considered an important geological heritage. It is believed to be the longest cave in Egypt.

== Discovery ==
Sannur Cave system was discovered in the 1980s, roughly 71 miles (115 km) south-southeast of Cairo, after quarry blasting created an overall entrance. The cave is also 6.2 miles (10 km) south-southeast of the city of Beni Suef.

== Geology ==
Sannur Cave has only one chamber which is about 2,300 ft (700 m) long and 50 ft (20 m) in diameter. It is a limestone cave overlaid with alabaster created by thermal springs. Its unique geology and unusual formations of stalactites and stalagmites led it to being recognized as an Egyptian Protectorate in 1992.
