= Dunqul Oasis =

Dunqul Oasis was an oasis near the First Cataract of the Nile in southern Egypt. It lies southwest of modern city of Aswan. Considered one of the most important oases of Ancient Egypt, it was used by General Weni as a staging point for military incursions into Nubia during the reign of Pepi I in the late 24 century BC.
