= Saluga and Ghazal Protectorate =

Protected islands in the Nile

Coordinates: 24°04′12″N 32°52′21″E

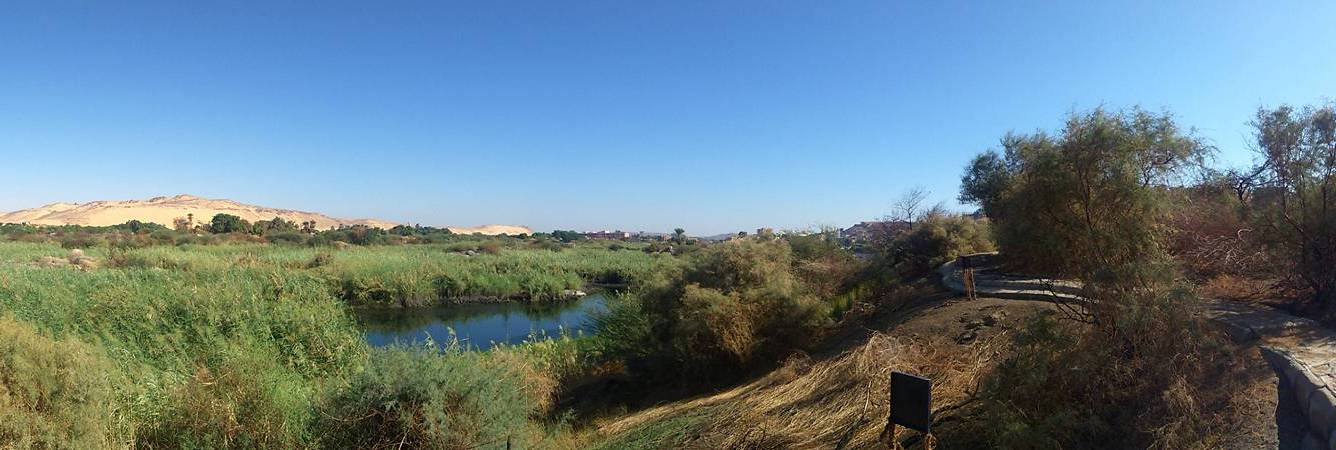
The Saluga and Gazelle Reserve

Salouga and Ghazal Protected Area is one of the smallest protectorates in Egypt. It contains two main islands named Salouga and Ghazal managed by the Egyptian Environmental Affairs Authority (EEAA) The name Salouga means waterfall in the ancient Nubian language. The two islands are located in the Nile River south of the city of Aswan but downstream of the Aswan Dam. It was established in 1986 with the purpose of protecting the biological diversity of threatened animals, plants and mammals.

The designation of these islands in the River Nile includes:

...they support a luxuriant natural vegetation cover including some of the only remnants of natural nilotic vegetation existing in the Nile Valley before cultivation by man. The islands protectorate shelters a botanical diversity of some 94 species... (including) many characteristic Nile fauna, particularly birds. The Protected Area plays an important role in preserving an exceptionally beautiful natural landscape of the Nile River at Aswan, which has long been one of the city’s primary tourist attractions.

Increasing human pressures, including the careless use of fires on the mainland, have led to seriously damaging fires on the two islands.
