= Faiyum =

Faiyum الفيوم
- City
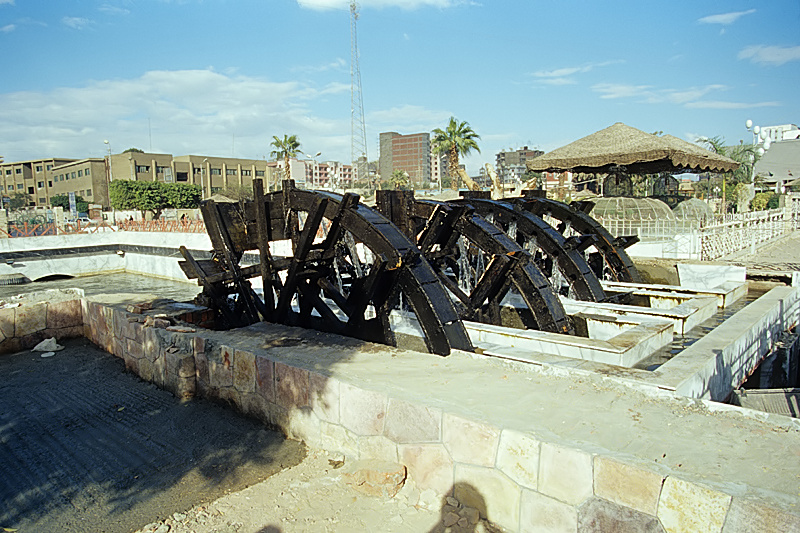
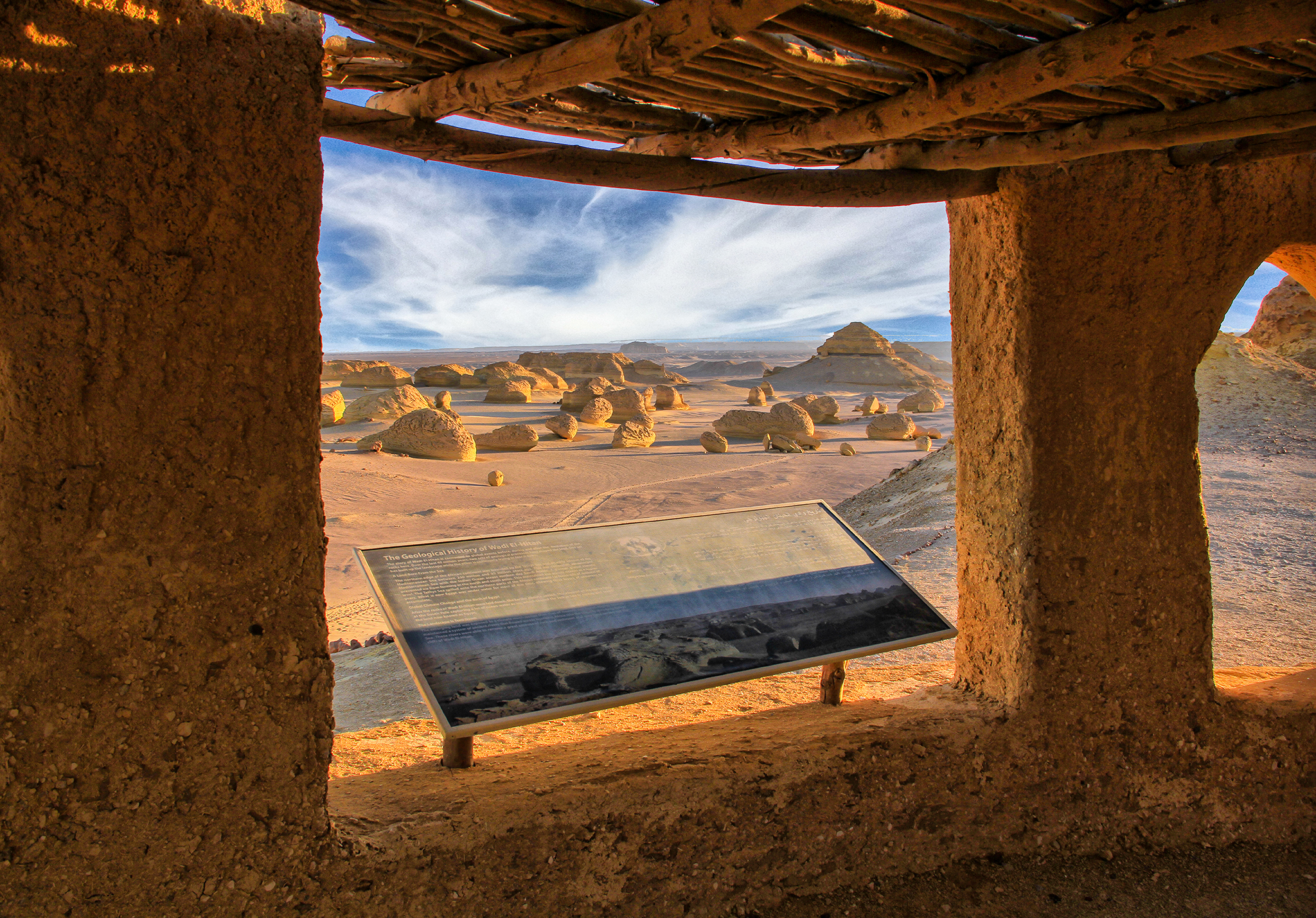
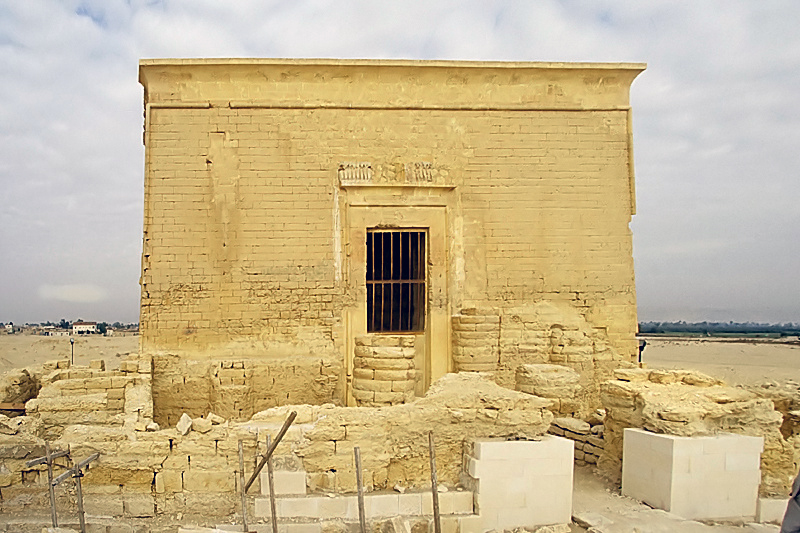
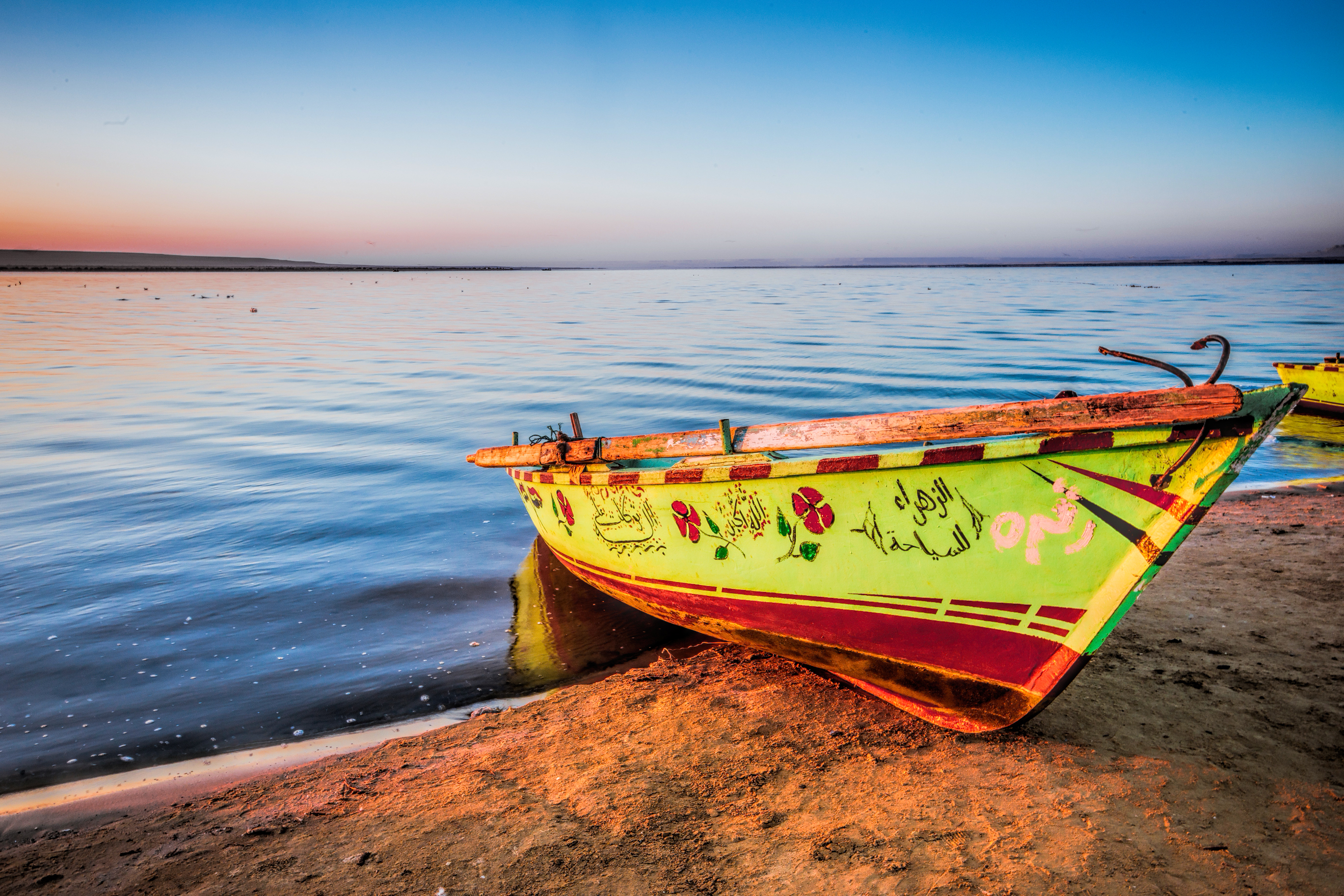
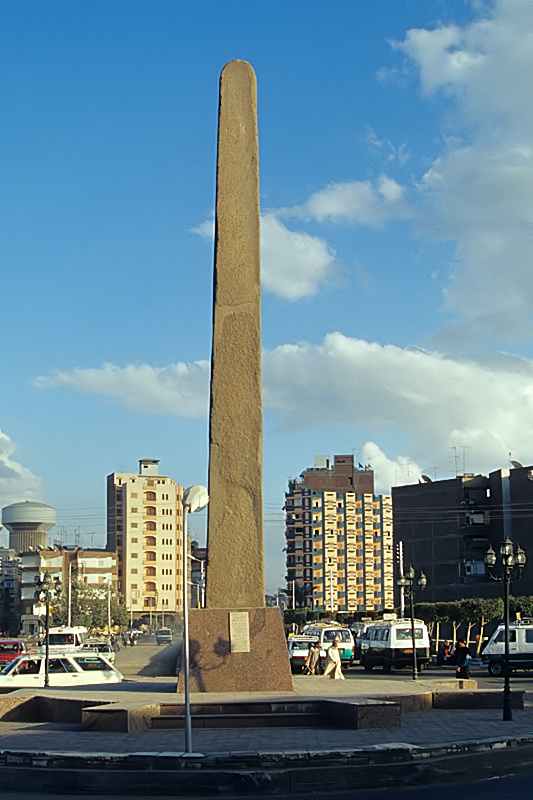
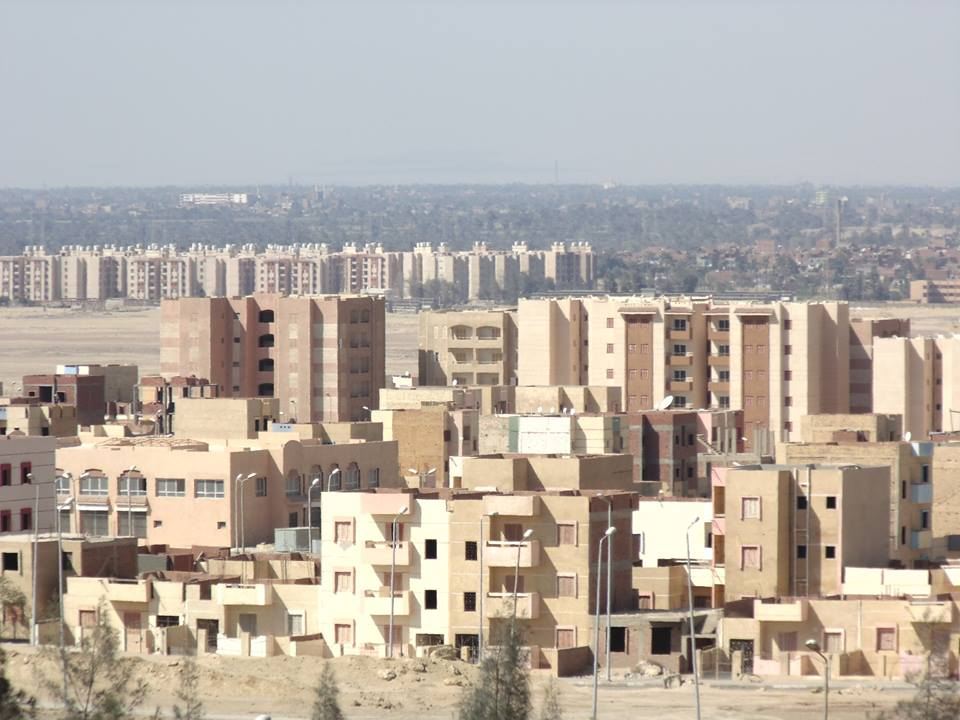
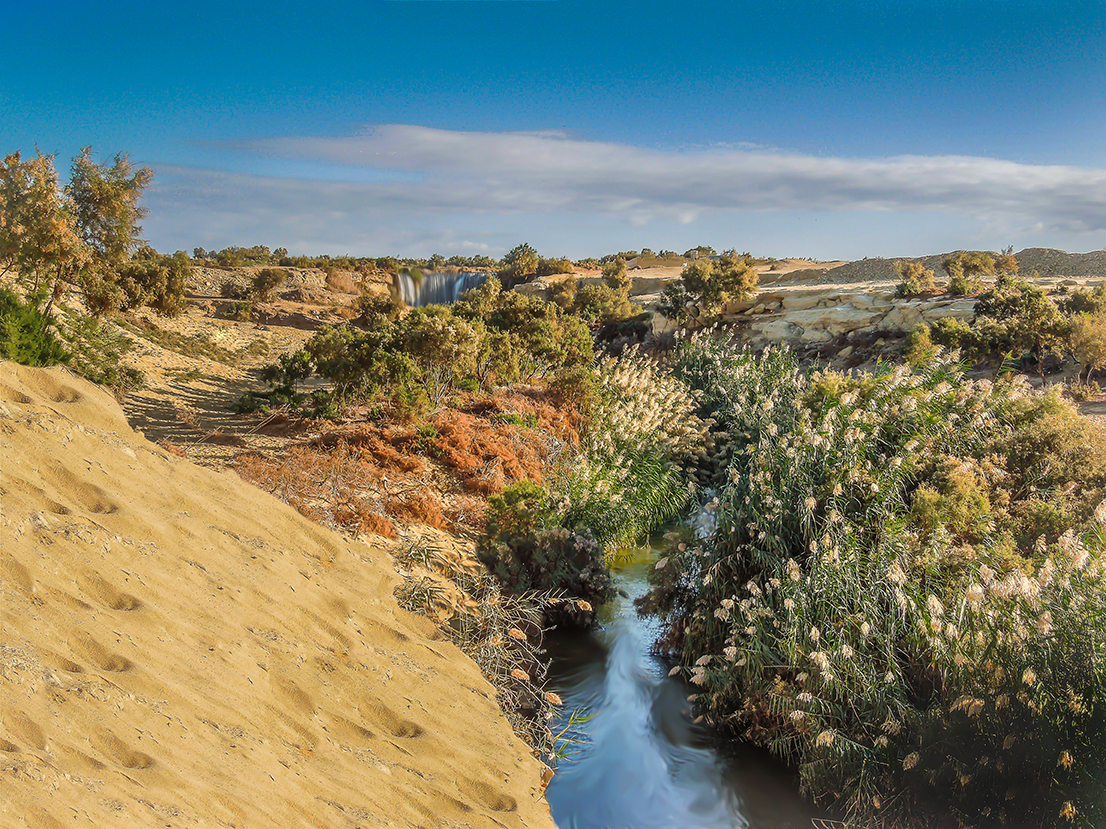
- Noria Sobek Temple Qarun Palace Facade Lake Moeris Egyptian Obelisk New Faiyum Wadi El Rayan

- Location within Egypt
- Coordinates: 29.308374°N 30.844105°E
- Country: Egypt
- Governorate: Faiyum

Area
  - Total: 18.5 km^{2} (7.1 sq mi)
- Elevation: 29 m (95 ft)

Population (2024)
  - Total: 440,000
  - Density: 24,000/km^{2} (62,000/sq mi)
- Demonym(s): Faiyumi (Male, Arabic: فيومي) Faiyumiyah (Female, Arabic: فيومية)

GDP (nominal, constant 2015 values)
  - Year: 2024
  - Total: $2.5 billion
  - Per capita: $5,682
- Time zone: UTC+2 (EET)
  - Summer (DST): UTC+3 (EEST)

Faiyum (/faɪˈjuːm/ fy-YOOM; Egyptian Arabic: الفيوم, romanized: el-Fayyūm, locally [elfæjˈjuːm]) (Note: Borrowed from Coptic Ⲫⲓⲟⲙ (Phiom) or Ⲫⲓⲱⲙ (Phiōm), from Egyptian pꜣ ym, meaning "the Sea" or "the Lake". Originally called Shedet (šd t) in Egyptian, the Greeks renamed it Κροκοδειλόπολις (Krokodeilópolis) in Koine Greek, and later Ἀρσινόη (Arsinóë) in Byzantine Greek.) is a city geographically in Lower Egypt but culturally and politically in Upper Egypt, 100 kilometres (62 miles) southwest of Cairo. In the Faiyum Oasis, it is the capital of the modern Faiyum Governorate. It is one of Egypt's oldest cities due to its strategic location.

== Name and etymology ==
F30 d t O49 šd t in hieroglyphs	pA A i i G20 mw N36 pꜣ ym in hieroglyphs

Originally founded by the ancient Egyptians as Shedet, its current name in English is also spelled as Fayum, Faiyum or al-Faiyūm. Faiyum was also previously officially named Madīnat al-Faiyūm (Arabic for The City of Faiyum). The name Faiyum (and its spelling variations) may also refer to the Faiyum Oasis, although it is commonly used by Egyptians today to refer to the city.

The modern name of the city comes from Coptic ̀Ⲫⲓⲟⲙ /Ⲡⲉⲓⲟⲙ epʰiom/peiom (whence also the personal name Ⲡⲁⲓⲟⲙ payom), meaning the Sea or the Lake, which in turn comes from late Egyptian pꜣ-ym of the same meaning, a reference to the nearby Lake Moeris; the extinct elephant ancestor Phiomia was named after it.

== Ancient history ==
Archaeological evidence has found occupations around the Faiyum dating back to at least the Epipalaeolithic. Middle Holocene occupations of the area are most widely studied on the north shore of Lake Moeris, where Gertrude Caton Thompson and Elinor Wight Gardner did a number of excavations of Epipalaeolithic and Neolithic sites, as well as a general survey of the area. Recently the area has been further investigated by a team from the UCLA/RUG/UOA Fayum Project.

According to Roger S. Bagnall, habitation began in the fifth millennium BC and a settlement was established by the Old Kingdom (c. 2685–2180 BC) called Shedet (Medinet el-Fayyum). It was the most significant centre of the cult of the crocodile god Sobek (borrowed from the Demotic pronunciation as Koine Greek: Σοῦχος Soûkhos, and then into Latin as Suchus). In consequence, the Greeks called it "Crocodile City" (Koine Greek: Κροκοδειλόπολις Krokodeilópolis), which was borrowed into Latin as Crocodilopolis. The city worshipped a tamed sacred crocodile called, in Koine, Petsuchos, "the One whom Soukhos has given", that was adorned with gold and gem pendants. The Petsoukhos lived in a special temple pond and was fed by the priests with food provided by visitors. When Petsuchos died, it was replaced by another.

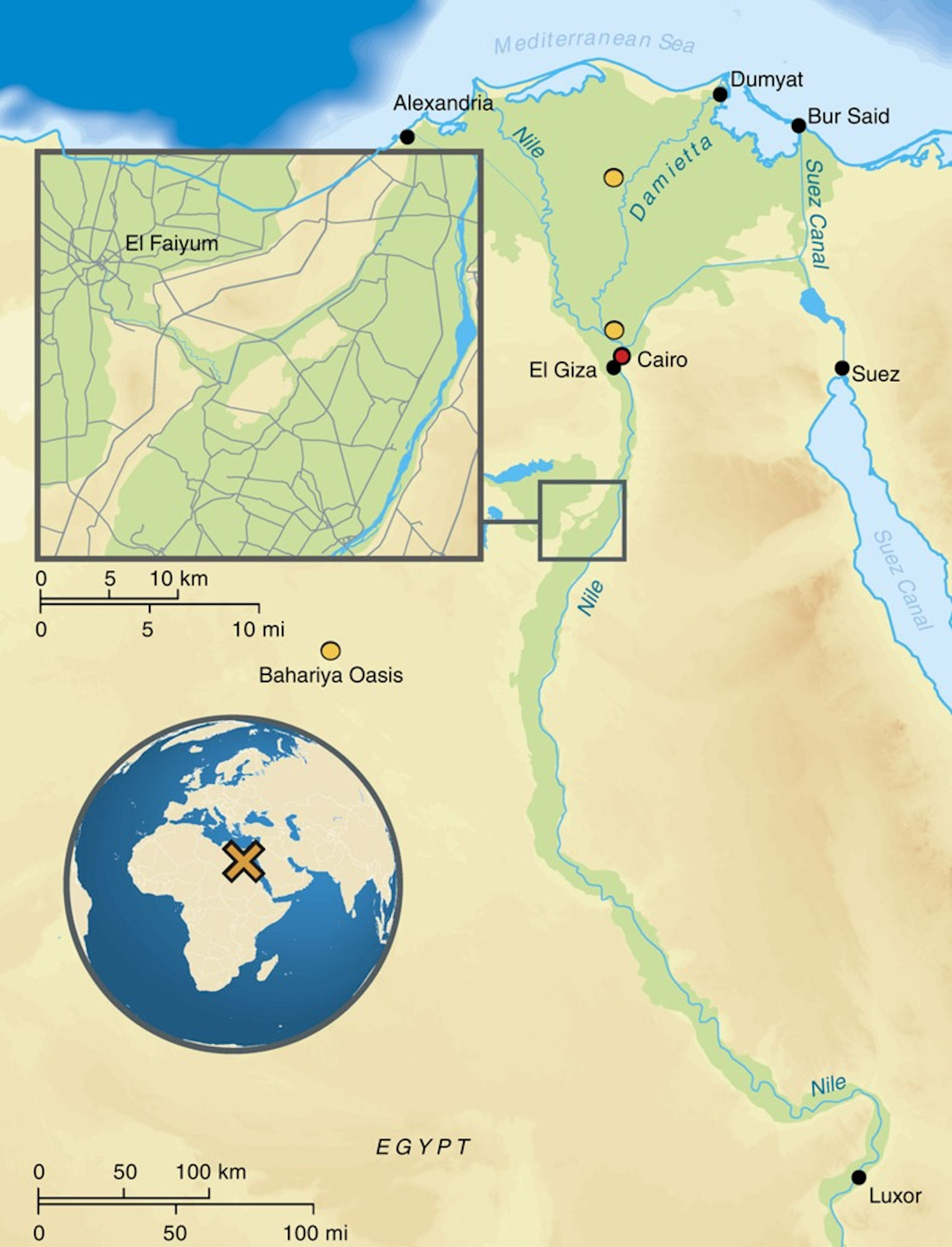
El Faiyum map

Under the Ptolemaic Kingdom, the city was called Ptolemais Euergétis (Koine Greek: Πτολεμαῒς Εὐεργέτις) until Ptolemy II Philadelphus (309–246 BC) renamed the city Arsinoë and the whole nome after the name of his sister-wife Arsinoe II (316–270 or 268), who was deified after her death as part of the Ptolemaic cult of Alexander the Great, the official religion of the kingdom. Ptolemy II Philadelphus also established a town at the edge of Faiyum named Philadelphia. It was laid out in a regular grid plan to resemble a typical Greek city, with private dwellings, palaces, baths and a theatre.

Under the Roman Empire, Arsinoë became part of the province of Arcadia Aegypti. To distinguish it from other cities of the same name, it was called "Arsinoë in Arcadia".

With the arrival of Christianity, Arsinoë became the seat of a bishopric, a suffragan of Oxyrhynchus, the capital of the province and the metropolitan see. Michel Le Quien gives the names of several bishops of Arsinoë, nearly all of them associated with one heresy or another.

The Catholic Church, considering Arsinoë in Arcadia to be no longer a residential bishopric, lists it as a titular see.

Fayyum was the seat of Shahralanyozan, governor of Sasanian Egypt (619–629).

The 10th-century Bible exegete, Saadia Gaon, thought el-Fayyum to have actually been the biblical city of Pithom, mentioned in Exodus 1:11.

Benjamin of Tudela reported that Faiyum had 200 Jews in 1170.

Around 1245, the region became the subject of the most detailed government survey to survive from the medieval Arab world, conducted by Abū ‘Amr ‘Uthman Ibn al-Nābulusī.

=== Faiyum mummy portraits ===
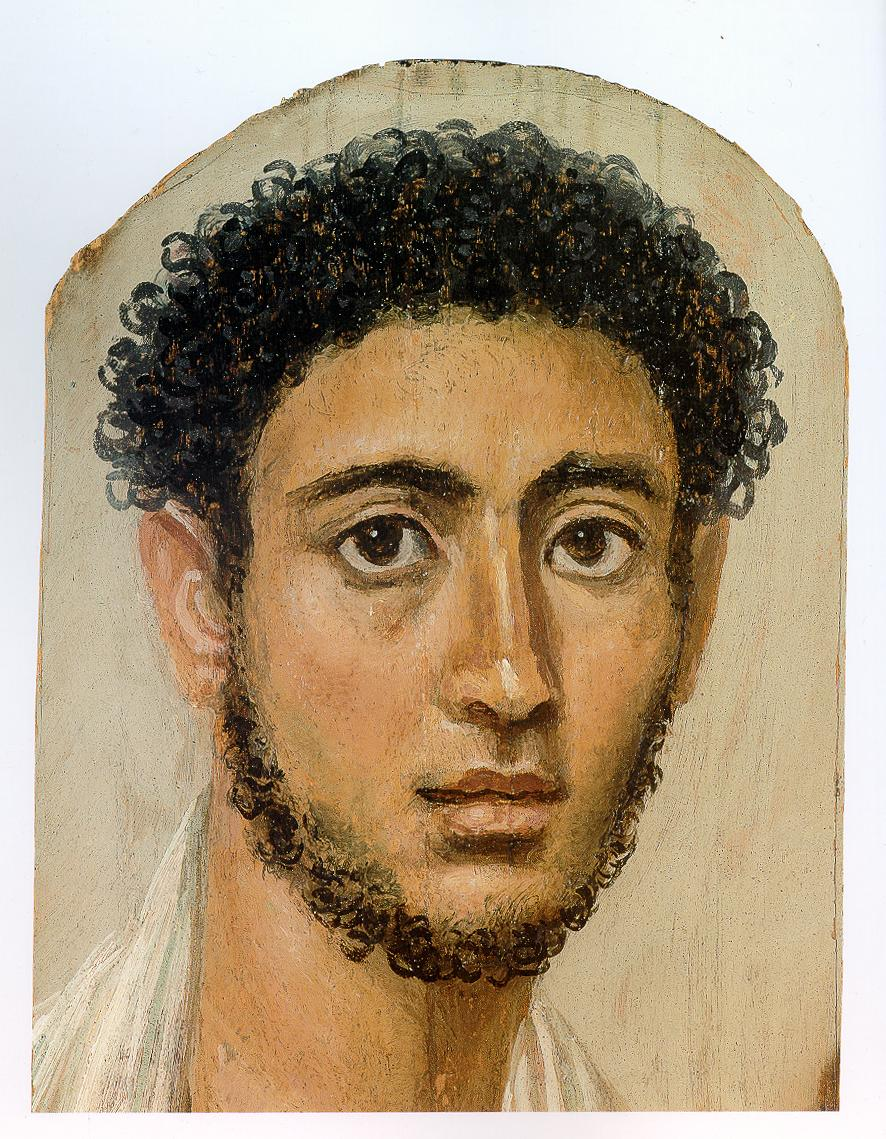
Portrait of a man, c. 125–150 AD. Encaustic on wood; 37 cm × 20 cm (15 in × 8 in)

Faiyum is the source of some famous death masks or mummy portraits painted during the Roman occupation of the area. The Egyptians continued their practice of burying their dead, despite the Roman preference for cremation. While under the control of the Roman Empire, Egyptian death masks were painted on wood in a pigmented wax technique called encaustic—the Faiyum mummy portraits represent this technique. While previously believed to represent Greek settlers in Egypt, modern studies conclude that the Faiyum portraits instead represent mainly native Egyptians, reflecting the complex synthesis of the predominant Egyptian culture and that of the elite Greek minority in the city.

=== The Zenon Papyri ===
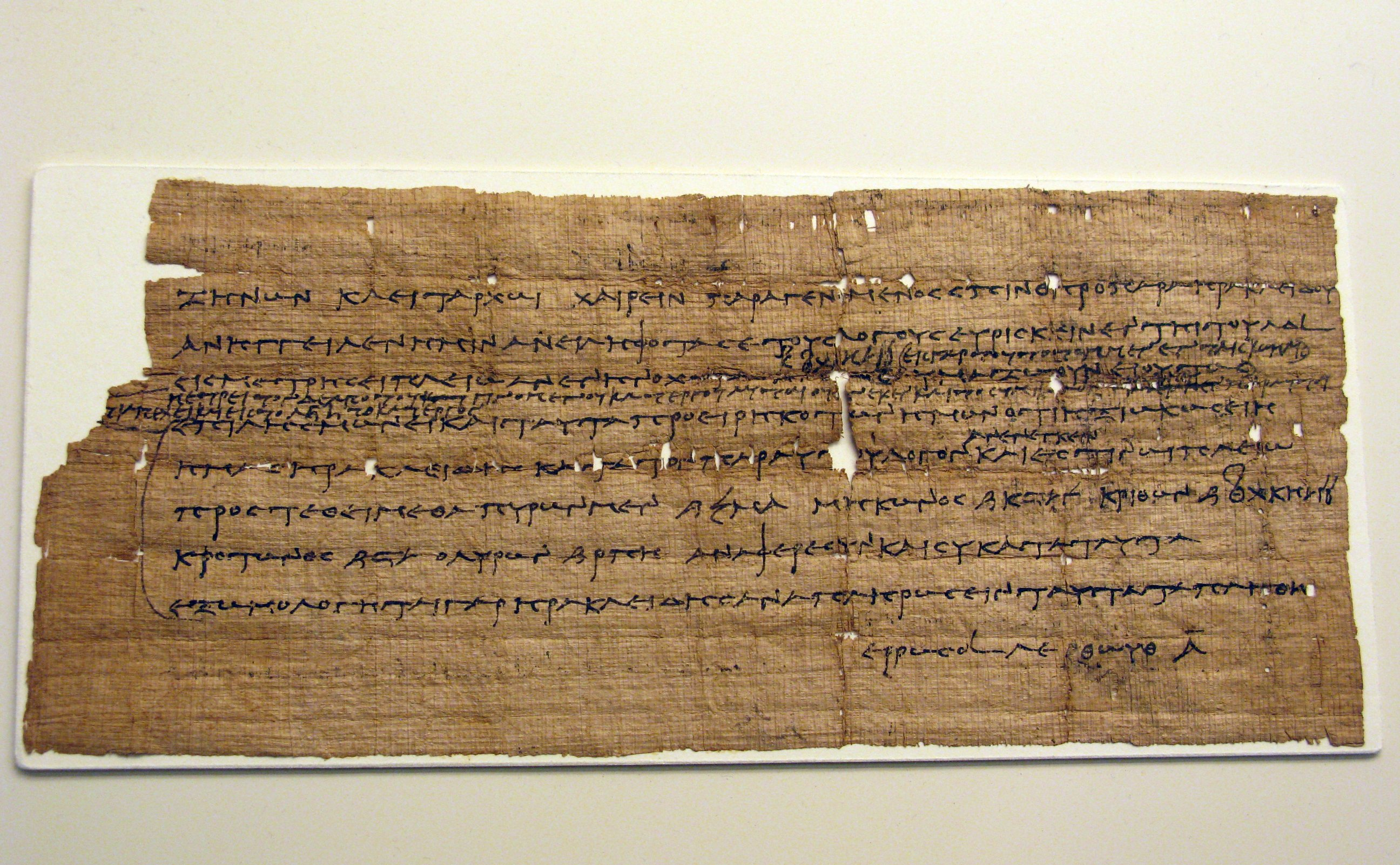
Fragment of a papyrus letter discussing tax issues from the Zenon Archive (National Archaeological Museum, Athens)

The construction of the settlement of Philadelphia under Ptolemy II Philadelphus was recorded in detail by a 3rd-century BC Greek public official named Zeno (or Zenon, Greek: Ζήνων). Zeno, a native of Kaunos in lower Asia Minor, came to Faiyum to work as private secretary to Apollonius, the finance minister to Ptolemy II Philadelphus (and later to Ptolemy III Euergetes). During his employment, Zeno wrote detailed descriptions of the construction of theatres, gymnasiums, palaces and baths in the 250s and 240s BC, as well as making copious written records of various legal and financial transactions between citizens.

During the winter of 1914–1915, a cache of over 2,000 papyrus documents was uncovered by Egyptian agricultural labourers who were digging for sebakh near Kôm el-Kharaba el-Kebir. Upon examination by Egyptology scholars, these documents were found to be records written by Zeno in Greek and Demotic. These papyri, now referred to as the Zenon Archive or the Zenon Papyri, have provided historians with a detailed record of 3rd-century BC Philadelphia society and economy. The discovery site was identified as the former location of ancient Philadelphia. Today, the precise location of the town is unknown, although archaeologists have identified two sites in north-east Faiyum as the possible location for Philadelphia.

== Modern city ==
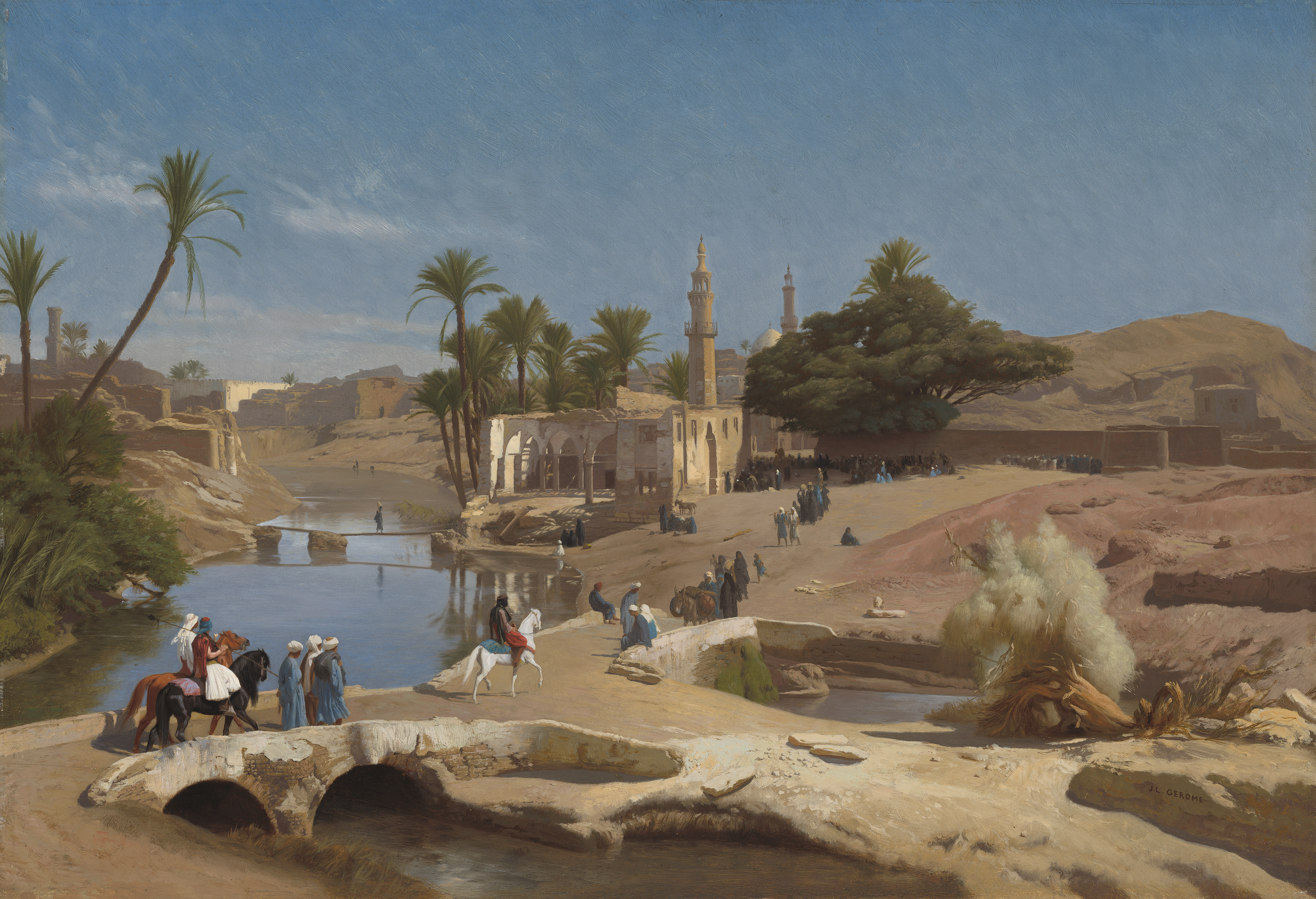
Jean-Léon Gérôme, View of Medinet El-Fayoum, c. 1868–1870

Faiyum has several large bazaars, mosques, baths and a much-frequented weekly market. The canal called Bahr Yussef runs through the city, its banks lined with houses. There are two bridges over the river: one of three arches, which carries the main street and bazaar, and one of two arches, over which is built the Qaitbay mosque, a gift from his wife to honor the Mamluk Sultan in Fayoum. Mounds north of the city mark the site of Arsinoe, known to the ancient Greeks as Crocodilopolis, where in ancient times the sacred crocodile kept in Lake Moeris was worshipped. The center of the city is on the canal, with four waterwheels which were adopted by the governorate of Fayoum as its symbol; their chariots and bazaars are easy to spot. The city is home of the football club Misr Lel Makkasa SC, that play in the Egyptian Second Division.

=== Main sights ===
- The population of Faiyum Governorate is 4,164,914.
- The Hanging Mosque, built when the Ottomans ruled Egypt by prince Marawan bin Hatem
- Hawara, an archeological site 27 km (17 mi) from the city
- Lahun Pyramids, 4 km (2 mi) outside the city
- Qaitbay Mosque, in the city; built by the wife of the Mamluk Sultan Qaitbay
- Qasr Qarun, 44 km (27 mi) from the city
- Wadi Elrayan or Wadi Rayan, the largest waterfalls in Egypt, around 50 km (31 mi) from the city
- Wadi Al-Hitan or Valley of whales, a paleontological site in the Al Fayyum Governorate, some 150 km (93 mi) southwest of Cairo. It is a UNESCO World Heritage Site.

== Climate ==
The Köppen-Geiger climate classification system classifies its climate as hot desert (BWh).

The highest record temperatures was 46 °C (115 °F) on June 13, 1965, and the lowest record temperature was 2 °C (36 °F) on January 8, 1966.

Climate data for Faiyum (1991–2020)
Month	Jan	Feb	Mar	Apr	May	Jun	Jul	Aug	Sep	Oct	Nov	Dec	Year
Mean daily maximum °C (°F)	20.6 (69.1)	22.5 (72.5)	26.2 (79.2)	31.3 (88.3)	35.4 (95.7)	38.2 (100.8)	38.8 (101.8)	38.6 (101.5)	36.4 (97.5)	32.7 (90.9)	26.8 (80.2)	22.1 (71.8)	30.8 (87.4)
Daily mean °C (°F)	11.6 (52.9)	13.2 (55.8)	16.1 (61.0)	20.0 (68.0)	24.8 (76.6)	28.1 (82.6)	29.3 (84.7)	29.3 (84.7)	27.3 (81.1)	23.6 (74.5)	18.2 (64.8)	13.5 (56.3)	21.3 (70.2)
Mean daily minimum °C (°F)	9.3 (48.7)	10.1 (50.2)	12.8 (55.0)	16.7 (62.1)	20.6 (69.1)	23.3 (73.9)	24.9 (76.8)	25.1 (77.2)	23.1 (73.6)	20.1 (68.2)	15.3 (59.5)	10.9 (51.6)	17.7 (63.8)
Average rainfall mm (inches)	2.0 (0.08)	1.4 (0.06)	1.0 (0.04)	0.4 (0.02)	0.1 (0.00)	0.0 (0.0)	0.0 (0.0)	0.0 (0.0)	0.0 (0.0)	0.5 (0.02)	1.1 (0.04)	1.8 (0.07)	8.3 (0.33)
Average relative humidity (%)	62	57	51	43	38	39	43	47	49	53	59	63	50
Source: World Meteorological Organization

== Notable people ==
People from Faiyum may be known as al-Fayyumi:

- Tefta Tashko-Koço (1910-1947), well-known Albanian singer, was born in Faiyum, where her family lived at that time.
- Saadia Gaon (882/892-942), the influential Jewish teacher of the early 10th century, was originally from Faiyum and often called al-Fayyumi.
- Youssef Wahbi (1898-1982), a notable Egyptian actor, well known for his influence on the development of Egyptian cinema and theater.
- Mohamed Ihab (b. 1989), Egypt's most decorated weightlifter. He is a World Champion competing in the 77 kg category until 2018 and currently in the 81 kg class.
- Mariam Fakhr Eddine (1933-2014), An Egyptian actress born in Fayoum, she was nicknamed "The Screen Beauty" for her foreign features. She appeared in over 240 films and died on November 3, 2014, due to a heart attack.
- Pope John XVIII of Alexandria (1769-1796), Pope John XVIII was born in Fayoum, Egypt. His lay name was Joseph. He became a monk in the Monastery of Saint Anthony.
- Magdy Atwa (b. 1983), An Egyptian football midfielder. He currently plays for Al-Sekka Al-Hadid.
- Sayed Moawad (b. 1979), An Egyptian retired professional footballer who played as a left-back. Moawad represented Egypt at the Africa Cup of Nations in 2008 and 2010 in which his country won.

== Gallery ==
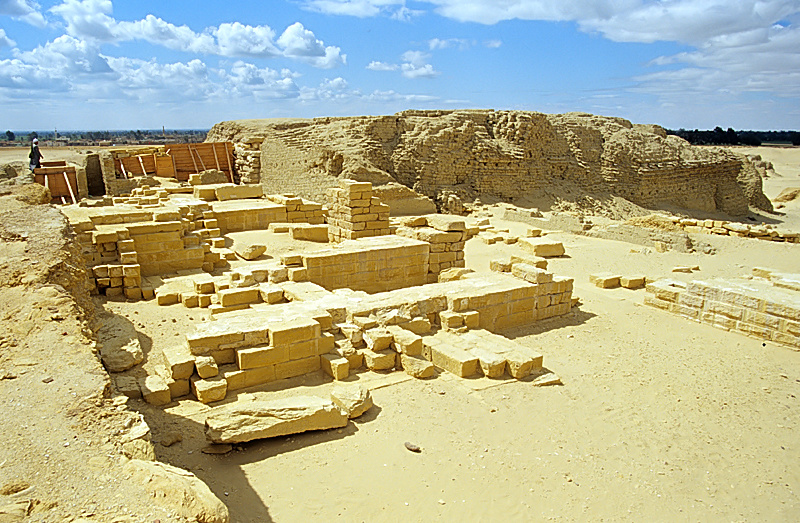
Stone temple of Soknobkonneus, Umm el-Athl (Bacchias)

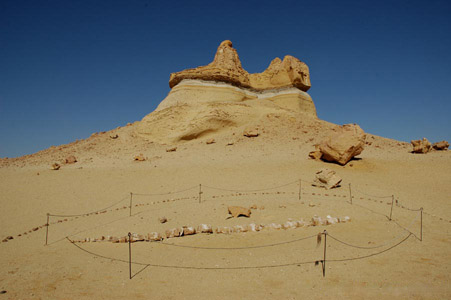
A whale skeleton lies in the sand at Wadi Al-Hitan (Arabic: وادي الحيتان, ‘Whale Valley’) near the city of Faiyum

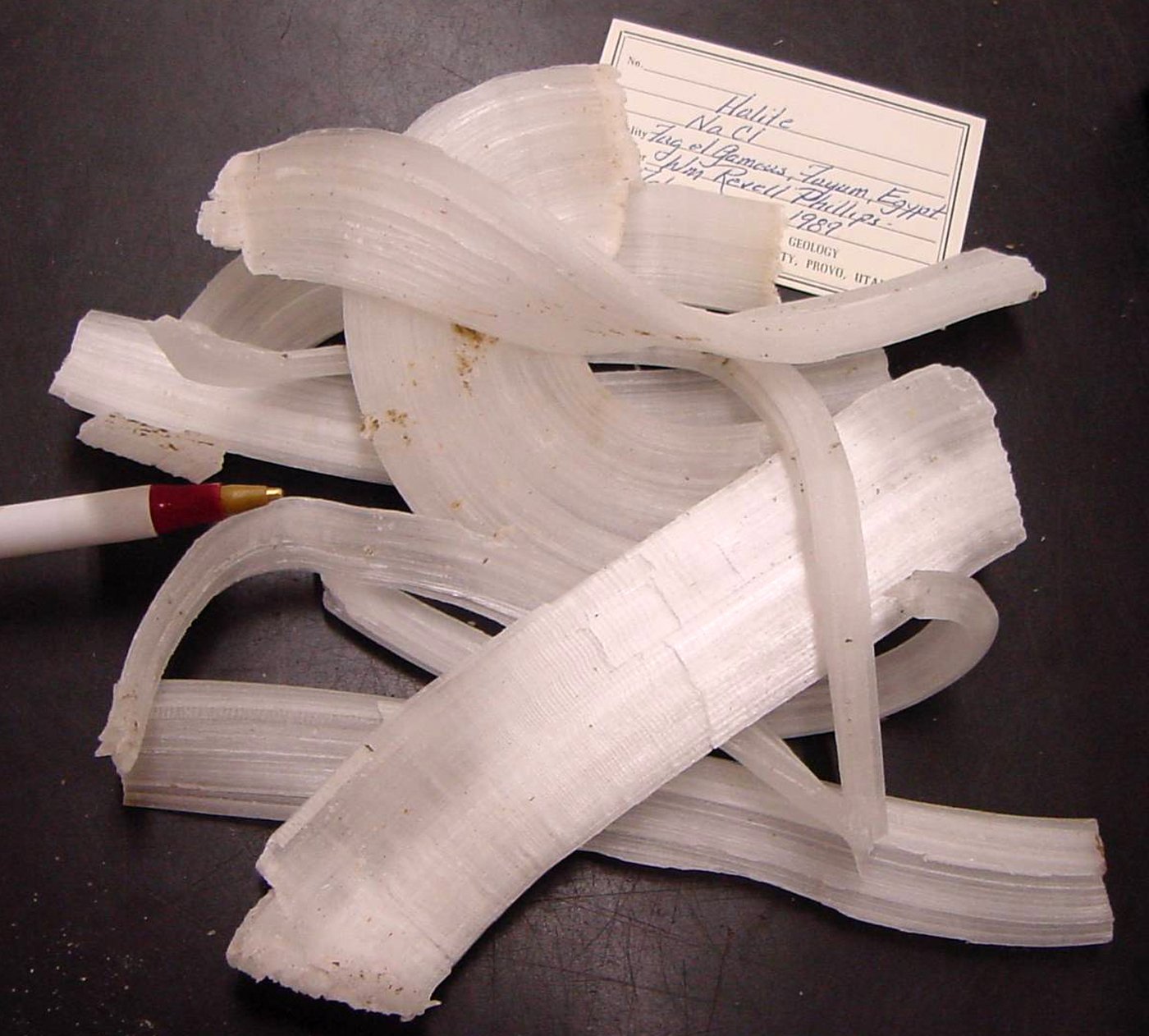
Unusual halite crystals from Fayum, Egypt.

== See also ==
- List of cities and towns in Egypt
- Book of the Faiyum
- Fayum alphabet
- Faiyum mummy portraits
- Lake Moeris
- Lake El Rayan
- Phiomia (an extinct relative of the elephant, named after Faiyum)
- Nash Papyrus
- Roman Egypt
- Wadi Elrayan
