= Menches =

2nd-century BC Egyptian scribe

- Village scribe (Note: Ancient Greek: κωμογραμματεύς, romanized: komogrammateus)
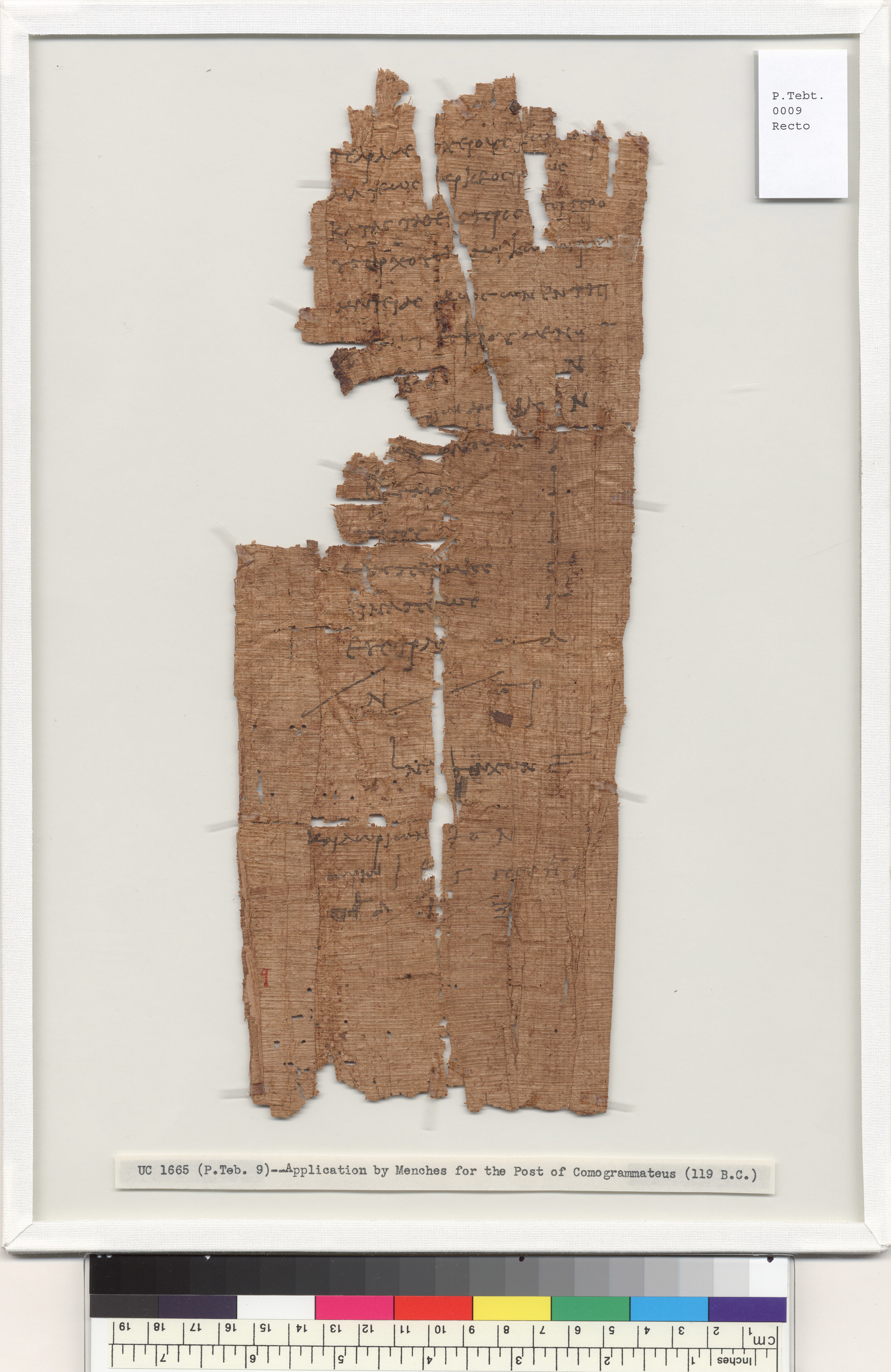
- Application by Menches for the post of village scribe, May 25, 119 BC
Egyptian name
mn n x U22 Y1mnḫ
- Tenure: Before 119–110 BC
- Dynasty: Ptolemaic Egypt

Menches was an ancient Egyptian official who served as the scribe of the village of Kerkeosiris from before 119 BC until 110 BC. He lived during the Ptolemaic period, when a Greek dynasty ruled Egypt. He was also known by the Greek name Asclepiades and may have been descended from Greek settlers, although little is known of his personal life.

Official responsibilities were to record land use and agriculture in Kerkeosiris and assess taxes owed to the pharaoh. In 118 BC, he was acquitted of attempted murder, after which he requested royal protection from harassment. Social instability complicated his duties; some of his fellow scribes went on strike in 118–117 BC and, in 114 BC, the village farmers cultivating royally owned land went on strike. The royal government granted Menches an allotment of farmland in 113 or 112 BC, although such grants were usually reserved for members of the military. In 111 BC, Menches shared the office of scribe with Petesouchos, who replaced him the following year.

The exact location of Kerkeosiris is unknown, and the only known evidence for Menches's life is a collection of preserved papyrus documents from his scribal office. These papyri were reused to wrap mummified crocodiles at a temple in the city of Tebtunis in the 1st century BC. The papyri were rediscovered in 1900 when English archaeologists Bernard Pyne Grenfell and Arthur Surridge Hunt excavated the temple's necropolis. Over the next 38 years, Hunt, Grenfell, and other scholars translated the papyri into English. The collected papyri are commonly known as the "archive of Menches" and are part of the Tebtunis archive at the Bancroft Library at the University of California, Berkeley. They are an important source of information about life in Egypt during the Ptolemaic period, including agricultural practices and local government.

== Historical background ==
Menches lived during the Ptolemaic period, which began when Egypt was conquered by Alexander the Great in 332 BC. After the death of Alexander in 323 BC, Egypt was ruled by Alexander's Greek general Ptolemy I (r. 323 – 282 BC), who established the Ptolemaic dynasty.

Menches resided and worked in the village of Kerkeosiris. The exact location of the village is not known, though it was somewhere in the Faiyum Oasis. It was likely founded in the early 3rd century BC, when the Ptolemies began large-scale land reclamation projects in the oasis. During this period, the Ptolemies granted allotments of farmland to Ptolemaic soldiers who settled in Egyptian villages. This policy resulted in the settlement of large numbers of Greek immigrants throughout the Egyptian countryside. Kerkeosiris was founded with the intent of being settled by Greeks and a large proportion of its land was assigned to soldiers.

== Biography ==
=== Early life and family ===
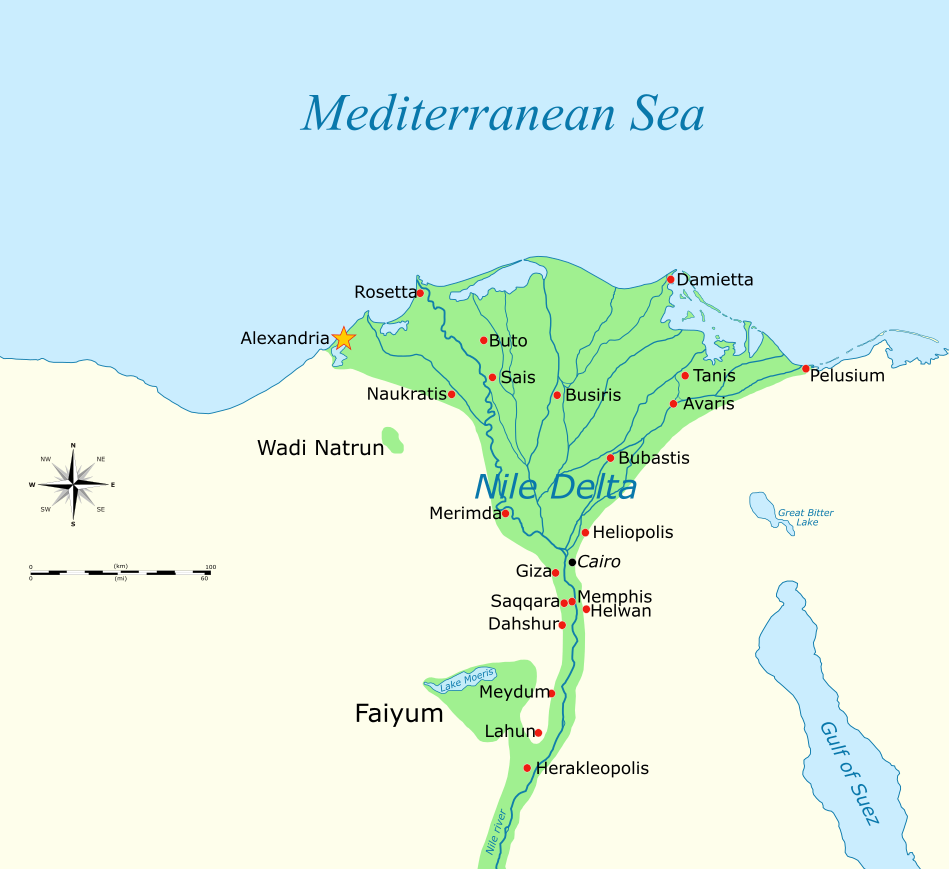
Map of Lower Egypt (c. 305 – c. 30 BC) with the location of Faiyum shown

The circumstances of Menches's life are known only through surviving papyrus letters that he wrote or received as a scribe. Few personal details about Menches are preserved in these documents, and his birth date is unknown. Menches was one of several sons born to Petesouchos and Thasis. His brothers included Polemon, who was the epistates, or chief administrator, of Kerkeosiris.

Another man, Mestasutmis, has been identified as a possible brother of Menches, as they were business partners and both had a father named Petesouchos. Papyrologist Arthur Verhoogt considers this identification uncertain because Petesouchos was a common name in Ptolemaic Egypt.

The name "Menches" (Ancient Greek: Μένχες) is a Hellenized version of Menekh (mnḫ), 'He who is perfect' in Egyptian. Menches was also known by the Greek name "Asclepiades" (Ἀσκληπιάδης). It was common for people in Ptolemaic Egypt to have a double name; they would use either their Greek or Egyptian name depending on the situation. Village scribes typically used their Egyptian names, and Menches used his Egyptian name primarily. Other male members of his family also used their Egyptian names more often than their Greek ones.

Menches and his father are both described as a "Greek of the country" in a contract from 112 BC, which may mean that they were descended from Greek immigrants who assimilated into Egyptian culture. Historian Christelle Fischer-Bovet suggested that the family were Egyptians who assimilated to Greek culture and may have had a single Greek ancestor. Alternatively, Menches and his father might have been called Greeks to indicate that they held a privileged tax status; in Ptolemaic Egypt after the 3rd century BC, ethnic labels were sometimes used to denote legal status and occupation.

=== Scribal activities ===
Menches held the position of komogrammateus (Ancient Greek: κομογραμματεύς) or 'village scribe', which gave him prestige and influence in his community. A scribal administration had existed in Egypt since the Old Kingdom (c. 2700 – c. 2200 BC) and continued into the Ptolemaic period. The dioiketes, or chief finance minister of Egypt, was responsible for appointing village scribes. Village scribes were the lowest ranking officials in the administration, beneath the toparchy scribes (topogrammateus), who administered districts within a province, and the royal scribes (basilikos grammateus), who administered an entire province. Most scribes were native Egyptians who were required to be bilingual in Egyptian and Greek, although the highest levels of the Ptolemaic government were under Greek control.

Menches was first appointed to the position of village scribe sometime before 119 BC. A document written by Menches mentions the appointment of a new scribe for an unnamed village in 123 or 122 BC, which may refer to the date that he first became a scribe. Menches applied to be reappointed as village scribe on May 25, 119 BC, promising to rent 10 arouras (6.7 acres or 2.7 hectares) of farmland from the royal government. Cultivating and reclaiming unproductive land is thought to have been a formal prerequisite for the appointment. He also pledged to deliver another large payment of grain; this may have been intended as a bribe to a government official, or as a gift to the villagers in exchange for their support. Menches promised that he would provide a portion of this payment and that the rest would be supplied by Dorion, a wealthy politician from Egypt's capital city Alexandria. Dorion ultimately paid for every expense related to his reappointment. It is unknown why Dorion supported Menches. On August 20, 119 BC, the royal scribe renewed Menches for another term as village scribe.

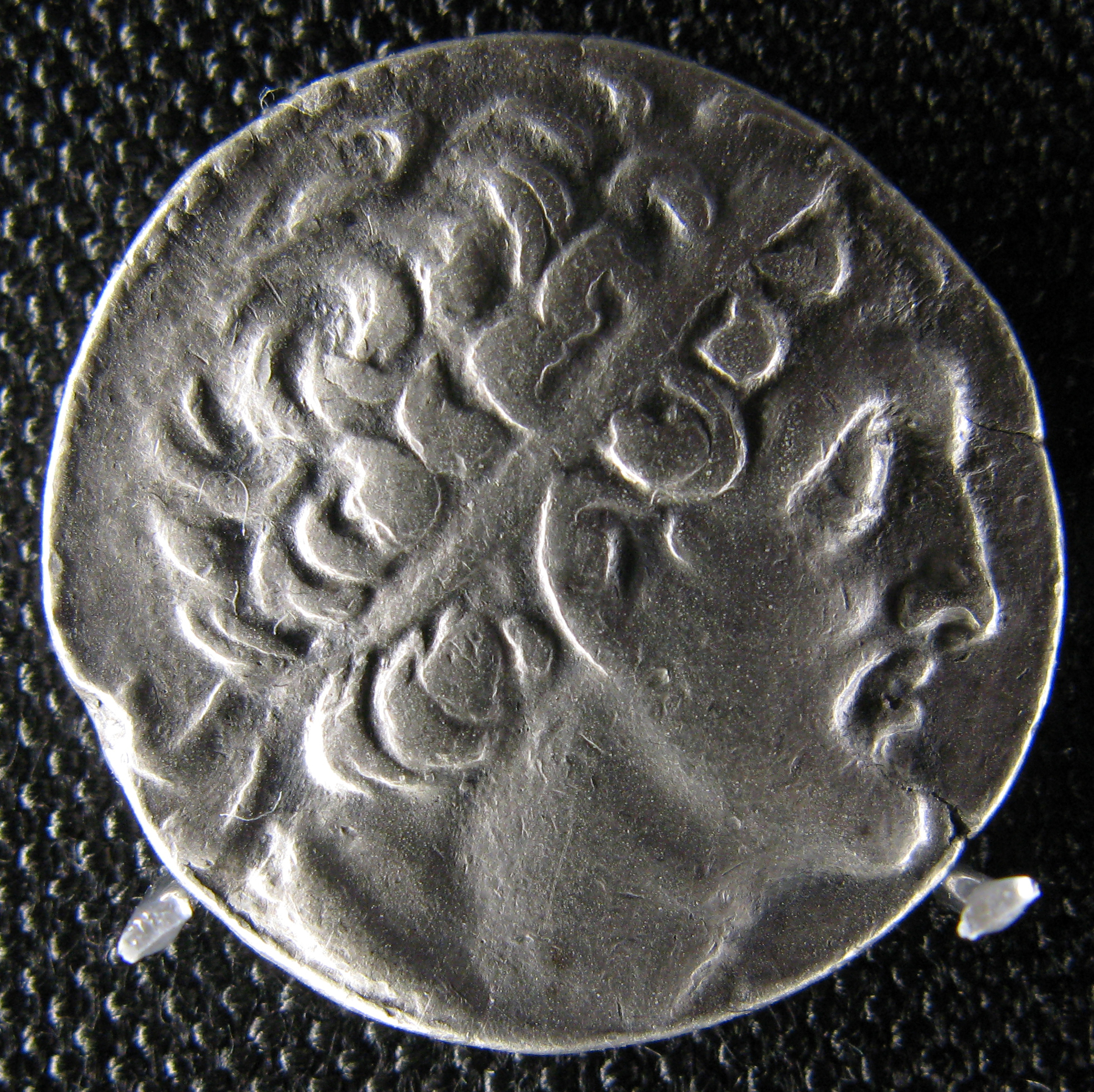
Coin of Ptolemy VIII

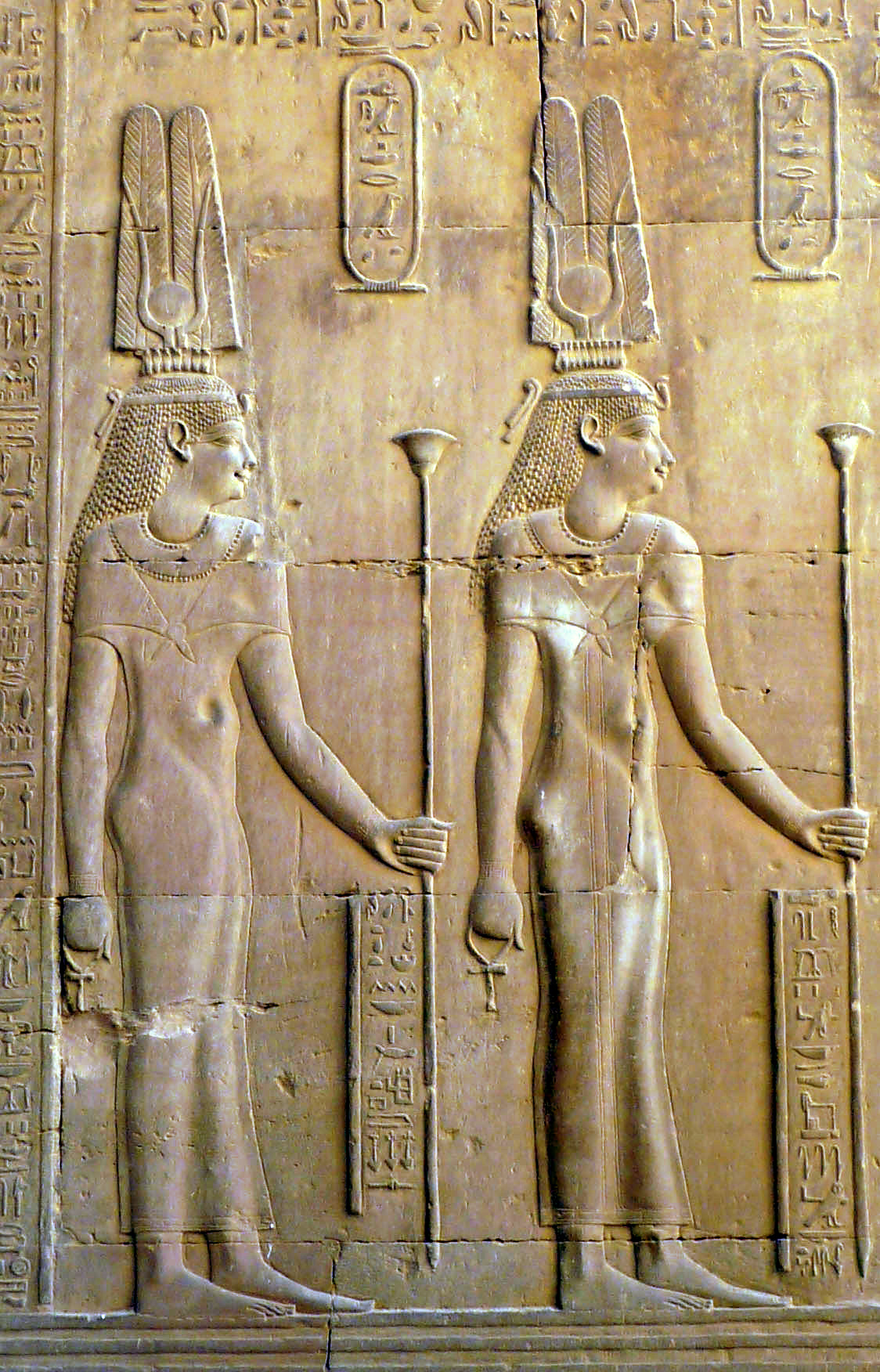
Relief of Cleopatra II and Cleopatra III from Kom Ombo

Menches's primary responsibilities were recording the village's land and inhabitants, and assessing the taxes and rents that were owed to the pharaoh. He conducted detailed land surveys and maintained a complete registry of agricultural land in the village, including records of what crops were grown and the outcome of each harvest. He supervised sowing, harvesting, irrigation projects, and other public works. Menches traveled to Alexandria at least three times to attend meetings held by the dioiketes. He also visited Krokodilopolis, a city in the Faiyum Oasis, to discuss agricultural surveys with the royal scribe.

Menches's tenure coincided with a period of economic and social unrest in the aftermath of a civil war fought by Ptolemy VIII and Cleopatra III against Cleopatra II. Although the war ended in 124 BC when the three pharaohs agreed to rule together, order was not restored throughout Egypt until several years later. During the post-war unrest, many farmers abandoned their villages to become brigands, leaving the fields uncultivated. Local officials exacted extortionate tolls on the peasantry while ignoring rights such as the right of asylum. As the economy worsened, the price of basic items increased due to inflation. The flight of tenant farmers in Kerkeosiris resulted in a loss of tax revenue, and 12 of Menches's fellow scribes went on strike between 118 and 117 BC. These circumstances made it difficult for Menches to perform his duties as scribe.

=== Murder trial and later career ===
On December 7, 118 BC, Menches, his brother Polemon, and two of their companions were arrested for attempted murder. They were charged with attempting to poison a man named Haryotes, who was a citizen of Krokodilopolis. The group was put on trial and acquitted on December 9. After his acquittal, Menches continued to fear slander and reprisal over the incident. In May 117 BC, he sent a petition to Ptolemy VIII, Cleopatra II and Cleopatra III, asking them to protect him from harassment. Menches may have wanted to improve his reputation before an investigation of village scribes that was scheduled to take place in the summer of 117 BC. During the investigation, royal officials arrested several scribes for misconduct to set an example of proper behavior.

While Menches was visiting Krokodilopolis in 114 BC, he learned that the farmers who cultivated royal land in his village were conducting a strike. He reported the strike to the royal scribes on November 9, 114 BC. The strike significantly reduced the village's agricultural revenues the following year, and it is not known whether the farmers' demands were resolved or if they were replaced by other farmers. In 113 or 112 BC, Menches received 20 arouras (13.4 acres or 5.4 hectares) of waterlogged farmland from the state. The land was granted to him through the cleruchy, a system where the state distributed plots of farmland to individuals as compensation for service. Cleruchic land was generally only granted to members of the Ptolemaic army or police, not to civilian officials such as Menches. Historian Dorothy J. Crawford suggested that Menches might have received cleruchic land through a new royal policy introduced to increase tax revenue by encouraging the cultivation of previously unproductive farmland.

Beginning in 111 BC, Menches shared the position of scribe with a man named Petesouchos, who may have been a member of his family. This shared tenure was likely a training period for Petesouchos, who succeeded Menches as the village scribe in 110 BC.

== Archive of Menches ==
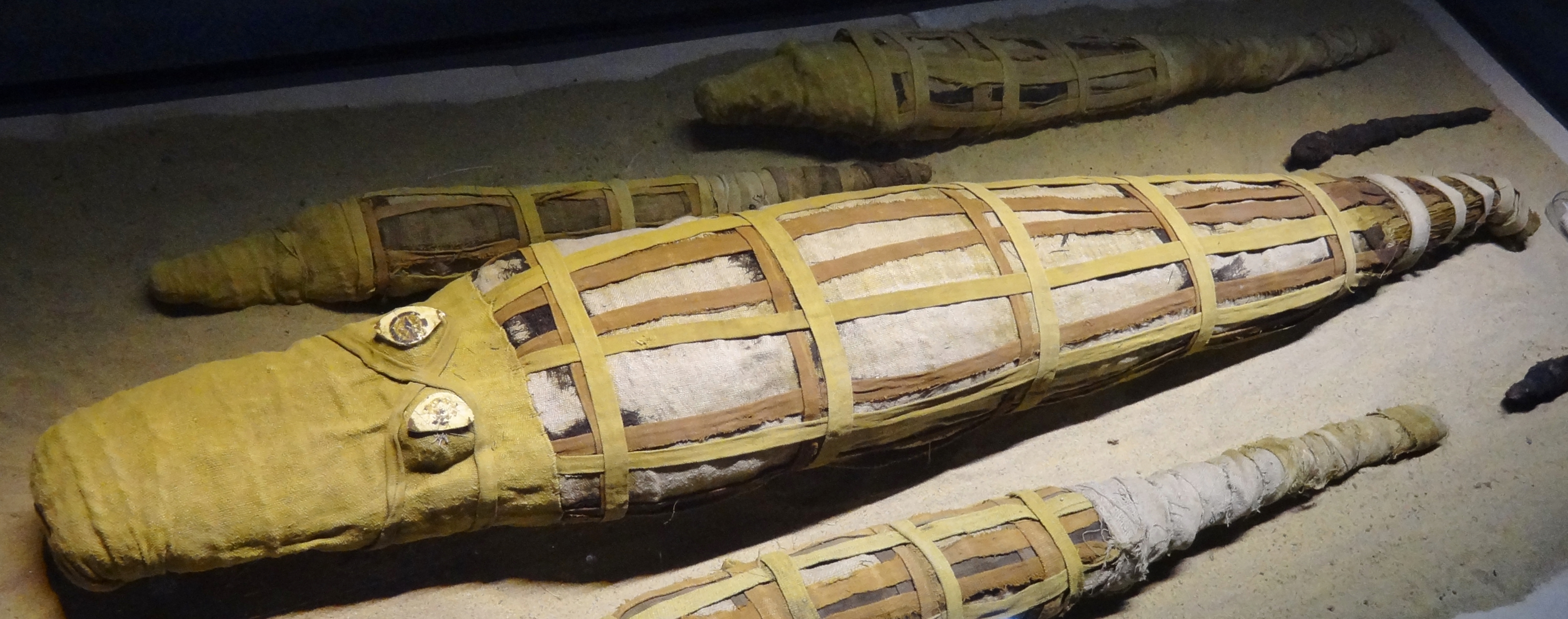
Mummified crocodiles from ancient Egypt

The collection of papyri commonly called the "archive of Menches" contains roughly 200 documents that were written or received by the village scribe of Kerkeosiris. Most were created during the tenure of Menches, although the collection also includes documents from his predecessor and his successor. These papyri were discarded by the scribe's office and taken by other people to be reused as writing material between 105 and 99 BC. Papyri from scribal offices were commonly reused, because papyrus was an expensive material. A papyrus document could be reused by scraping or rubbing off ink, or by writing on its blank backside. Large bookrolls from scribal archives were often cut into smaller pieces when they were reused. Excerpts of text, such as humorous expressions and passages of epic poetry, were written on the backside of some reused documents from Menches's office.

The reused papyri were recycled again after 91 BC, when they were used to stuff and wrap mummified crocodiles at the temple of Soknebtunis in Tebtunis; Soknebtunis was the local name of the crocodile god Sobek. Though crocodiles were hunted and held negative cultural associations in many parts of Egypt, in some regions they were worshipped as divine animals associated with Sobek. Cults centered around the worship of crocodiles were established in cities such as Krokodilopolis, Kom Ombo, and Thebes. Some temples kept live crocodiles and considered them to be living manifestations of the god. A small basin at the temple in Tebtunis is believed to have been used as a crocodile habitat.

After their death, the crocodiles at the temple of Soknebtunis were mummified by the priests and buried in a necropolis southwest of Tebtunis. After being stuffed with sticks and reeds, most of the crocodiles were wrapped in linen; a few were wrapped in papyrus. At least 10,000 mummified crocodile specimens have been found at the cemetery, including complete and partial animals.

=== Rediscovery and publication ===
The reused documents from Menches's office were discovered by English archaeologists Bernard Pyne Grenfell and Arthur Surridge Hunt during their excavation of the Tebtunis archive between 1899 and 1900. Grenfell and Hunt had been hired by American archaeologist George Andrew Reisner to excavate the site on behalf of the University of California, Berkeley. Their excavation began at Umm el-Baragat, a modern town at the site of Tebtunis. They were focused on discovering papyri, and chose Umm el-Baragat because it had not been disturbed by farmers and was dry enough to prevent papyri from decaying.

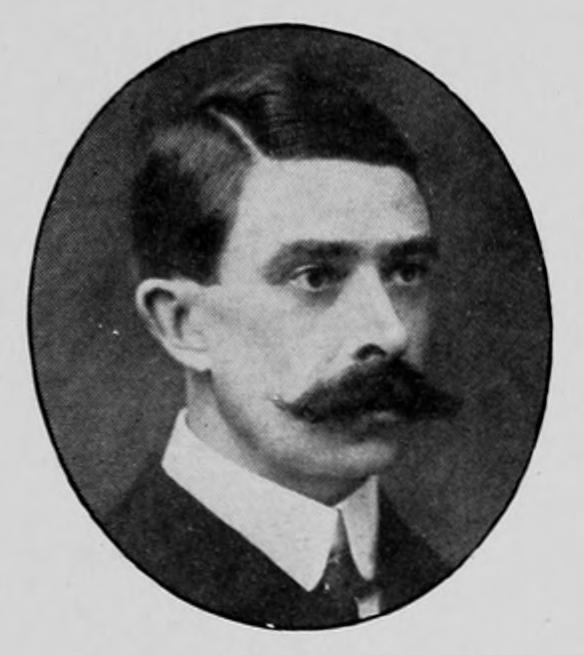
Bernard Pyne Grenfell at an unknown date before 1917

Grenfell and Hunt excavated houses, the temple of Soknebtunis, and a necropolis of human mummies south of Tebtunis. Many of the mummified humans were encased in cartonnage, a hard material made by layering damp sheets of linen or papyrus together with plaster. Grenfell and Hunt both initially considered the necropolis of mummified crocodiles to be unimportant. On January 16, 1900, one of the workmen at the site became frustrated that he was only finding mummified crocodiles instead of human sarcophagi. He kicked one of the crocodiles and broke it open, discovering that it was wrapped in reused papyri. Before this, archaeologists did not know that the ancient Egyptians occasionally wrapped mummies in rolls of papyrus.

Grenfell and Hunt found 31 crocodiles that were wrapped in papyri, and Italian archaeologist Achille Vogliano found 5 more during a separate expedition in 1934. At least 21 crocodile mummies contained papyri from the Menches archive, alongside a smaller number of unrelated papyri from the 2nd and 1st century BC. As Grenfell and Hunt expanded their excavations of cemeteries around Tebtunis, they found other human mummies with recycled papyri. They collected over 21,000 papyrus fragments at the site.

Grenfell and Hunt presented the results of their excavations to Reisner in mid-1900, and shipped the majority of the artifacts that they found to the University of California. The papyri were shipped to Oxford, England, where Grenfell and Hunt could translate and publish them. The first volume of The Tebtunis Papyri, containing many documents from the Menches archive, was published in 1902. The second volume, published in 1907, contained documents from the priests of Soknebtunis, most of which were created during the Roman period.

Grenfell's work on the papyri was interrupted by mental health issues between 1906 and 1914, and he was unable to continue after being hospitalized for his condition in 1920. Hunt continued publishing the papyri by himself in Grenfell's absence, although he was interrupted by military service between 1914 and 1918. The third volume of The Tebtunis Papyri was published in two parts, the first in 1933 and the second in 1938. The second part had to be finished by Irish papyrologist Josiah Gilbart Smyly and Scottish Egyptologist Campbell Cowan Edgar, as Hunt had died in 1934. The papyri were moved from London to the Bancroft Library at the University of California, Berkeley, in 1938.

=== Content and historical significance ===
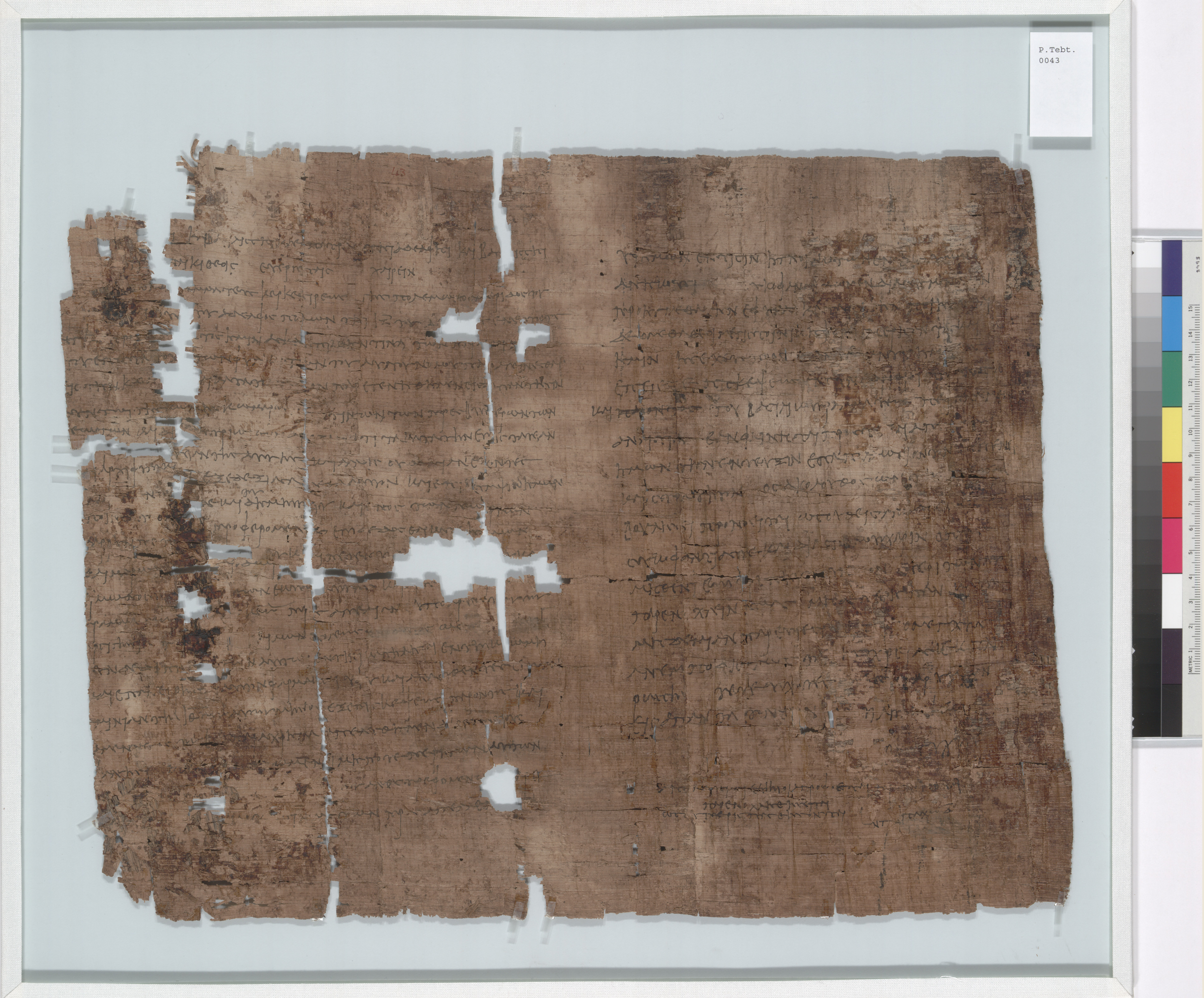
Petition from Menches to Ptolemy VIII, Cleopatra II, Cleopatra III, May 25, 117 BC

The "archive of Menches" is an important source of information about daily life, taxation, government, land ownership, agriculture, and populations in late 2nd-century BC Egypt. It records the daily operations of the scribal office in Kerkeosiris, including its revenues, expenses, and administrative responsibilities. Most of the papyri are related to land registries and agricultural reports. These documents describe every stage of agricultural production in the village, including planting, irrigation management, and harvesting. The archive's size and scope make it an informative source on how the Ptolemaic Egyptian government collected and used data.

The archive includes communications between Menches and his superiors, such as instructions that he received from the royal scribe. The papyrus P. Tebt. I 33 is a well-known correspondence from the archive; written by the chief finance minister in 112 BC, it announces that the Roman senator Lucius Memmius would be visiting the Faiyum Oasis. The documents also include reports of crimes that Menches received from civilians, such as allegations that oil smugglers were circumventing the government-granted monopoly on the vegetable oil industry. These villagers requested his assistance in forwarding their complaints to the appropriate government officials so that justice could be delivered.

Menches Day is celebrated on August 20 by staff at the Bancroft Library, where the Menches archive is held. The date was chosen because P. Tebt. 10, the papyrus that confirmed Menches' reappointment as scribe in 119 BC, is dated August 20. It is traditional to drink beer on Menches Day because of the belief that beer was invented in ancient Egypt.

== See also ==
- Zenon of Kaunos, scribe who flourished in 3rd-century BC Egypt
