= Phylakitai =

Police force of Ptolemaic Egypt

Agency overview
- Formed: Ptolemaic period
- Dissolved: 30 BCE
- Legal personality: Governmental: Government agency

Jurisdictional structure
- National agency: Ptolemaic Egypt
- Operations jurisdiction: Ptolemaic Egypt
- Map of Ptolemaic Egypt between the 3rd and 2nd Century BCE
- General nature: Civilian police

The phylakitai were the main police force of Ptolemaic Egypt when the kingdom was ruled by the Greek Ptolemaic dynasty. While the history of institutional policing in Egypt dates to the Old Kingdom, it is unclear whether the phylakitai were a continuation of older Egyptian institutions or whether they were a new development of the Ptolemaic period. The phylakitai were disbanded after Egypt was conquered by the Roman Empire in 30 BCE, and the Roman army took over police functions in Roman Egypt.

Phylakitai were professional police officers responsible for law enforcement and protection in the cities and countryside. The phylakitai were separate from the Ptolemaic army, although both institutions were organized in a similar way and their members received similar types of compensation. Officers were recruited from both the native Egyptian populace and from Greek immigrants. Like other parts of the Ptolemaic government, the phylakitai used Greek as their official language for correspondences, although the majority of Egypt's population spoke Egyptian. The term "phylakitai" (φυλακῖται) derives from the Greek word φύλαξ (phylax), which means "guard".

Much of what is known about the phylakitai comes from ancient papyrus documents that survived into the modern period. These documents include records of court proceedings and police correspondences that describe law enforcement operations in Ptolemaic Egypt. There is no comparable evidence for the existence of professional police forces in other ancient societies.

== History ==
=== Historiography ===
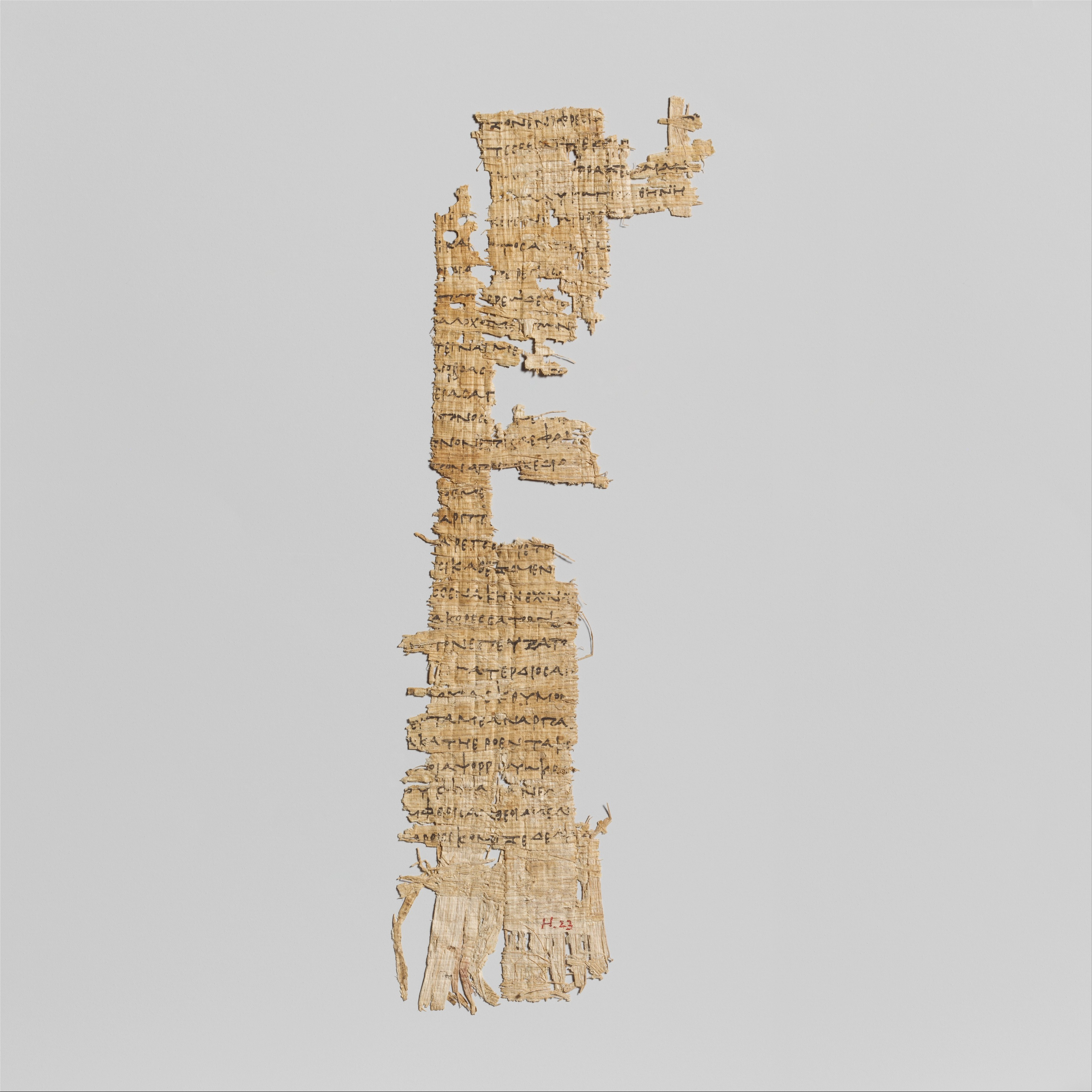
Fragmentary papyrus written in Greek, from Egypt c. 250 BCE

Ancient Egypt is uniquely well-documented among ancient societies, because a large amount of perishable writing material, specifically papyri, from Egypt has survived into modern times. The papyri provide the majority of surviving evidence for police functions in Egypt. These papyri include documents like records of court proceedings, correspondences between police officials, petitions from civilians, and letters from prisoners.

Surviving examples of ancient papyri are often fragmentary and provide incomplete information about Egyptian institutions. The majority of surviving papyri come from the Arsinoite and Heracleopolite regions of Egypt. Fewer papyri have survived in the Nile Delta region, which includes Alexandria, Egypt's capital in the Ptolemaic period. Outside of papyri, evidence for law enforcement in ancient Egypt is rare. Ancient historians generally did not document law enforcement proceedings in Egypt, and surviving inscriptions related to law enforcement typically provide only prosopographical data.

=== Origins and development ===
The phylakitai existed during the Ptolemaic period, which began after Egypt was conquered by Alexander the Great in 332 BCE. After Alexander's death, control of Egypt passed to his general Ptolemy I Soter, who established the Ptolemaic dynasty. The Ptolemaic dynasty preserved many preexisting public institutions in Egypt, while also establishing Greek public institutions and governmental buildings, and introducing Greek terminology to areas such as the military and legal system.

It is unknown whether the phylakitai were a continuation of earlier Egyptian police forces, whether they were newly introduced by the Ptolemaic dynasty, or whether they combined elements of Egyptian and Greek traditions. The existence of institutional policing in ancient Egypt can be traced to the Old Kingdom, and the Medjay notably operated as a professional police force in the New Kingdom Period. However, direct continuity between these earlier police institutions and the phylakitai has not been proven.

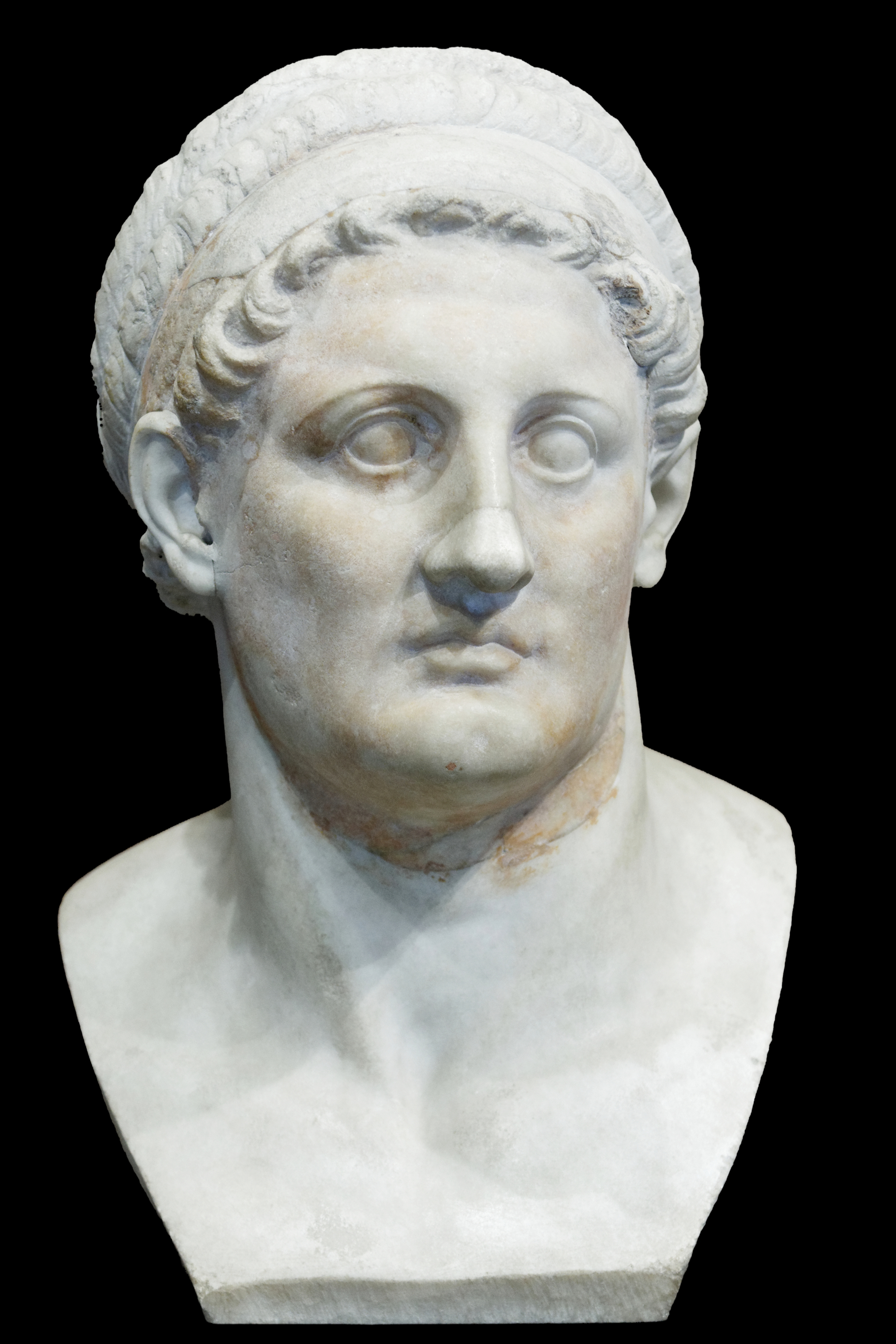
Sculpture of Ptolemy I Soter, c. 3rd century BCE

There is no comparable surviving evidence for the existence of professional law enforcement organizations like the phylakitai in other ancient societies. In many ancient states, civilians were responsible for investigating crimes committed against them and arresting suspects so they could be put on trial. Historian Joseph Manning interprets the large size of the police force in Egypt as a consequence of the Ptolemaic dynasty's need to control the native Egyptian populace through violent force.

In addition to professional police, there is evidence that peasants in Ptolemaic Egypt were conscripted for guard duty to defend crops and irrigation infrastructure. Part-time guards who protected crops and infrastructure were employed on a short term basis, and had less economic security than professional police.

=== Dissolution in the Roman period ===
After the Roman Empire conquered Egypt in 30 BCE and transformed it into a Roman province, the law enforcement system changed. The Romans dissolved the phylakitai, replacing them with a system where villages were policed by low-paid phylakes, and low-ranking officers in the Roman army were assigned to perform military police duties as stationarii. Soldiers, including stationarii, were used for police functions throughout the Roman Empire. The primary function of the stationarii was to maintain control and protect the interests of the state, although citizens also petitioned them to assist with punishing crimes and resolving legal disputes.

Roman Egypt was the most extensively policed province in the empire, with a larger police presence than other provinces. In Egypt, the practice of conscripting peasants for police duties had become increasingly common by the 2nd century CE, and a greater variety of specialized categories of police were introduced. The expansion of police in 2nd century Egypt may have been triggered by the civil unrest caused during the Diaspora Revolt from 115 to 117 CE.

== Terminology and etymology ==
Like other parts of the Ptolemaic government, the phylakitai used Greek as the primary language of official correspondences and petitions. Since the majority of the population spoke Demotic Egyptian, civilians relied on bilingual scribes to help translate their testimonies and complaints into Greek. The police produced Demotic Egyptian texts more rarely, typically in situations where the civilians and police involved were all Egyptian and there were no Greek overseers to insist on using the Greek language.

The term phylakitai is based on the Greek root word φύλαξ (phylax), which means "guard". Phylakitai is the most well-attested term for police in Greek papyri from Ptolemaic Egypt. In bilingual documents from the Ptolemaic era, the Greek term phylakitai is usually equivalent to the Egyptian word gl-ˇ sr. Less commonly, gl-ˇ sr was directly transcribed into Greek as kalasiries. In the Ptolemaic period, police designated as kalasiries primarily carried out police duties in Lower and Middle Egypt, but performed military duties in Upper Egypt where they guarded the southern border.

In addition to the phylakitai, there were other forms of professional police in Ptolemaic Egypt such as desmophylakes (prison guards), eremophylakes (desert guards), and potamophylakes (river guards).

== Organization and compensation ==
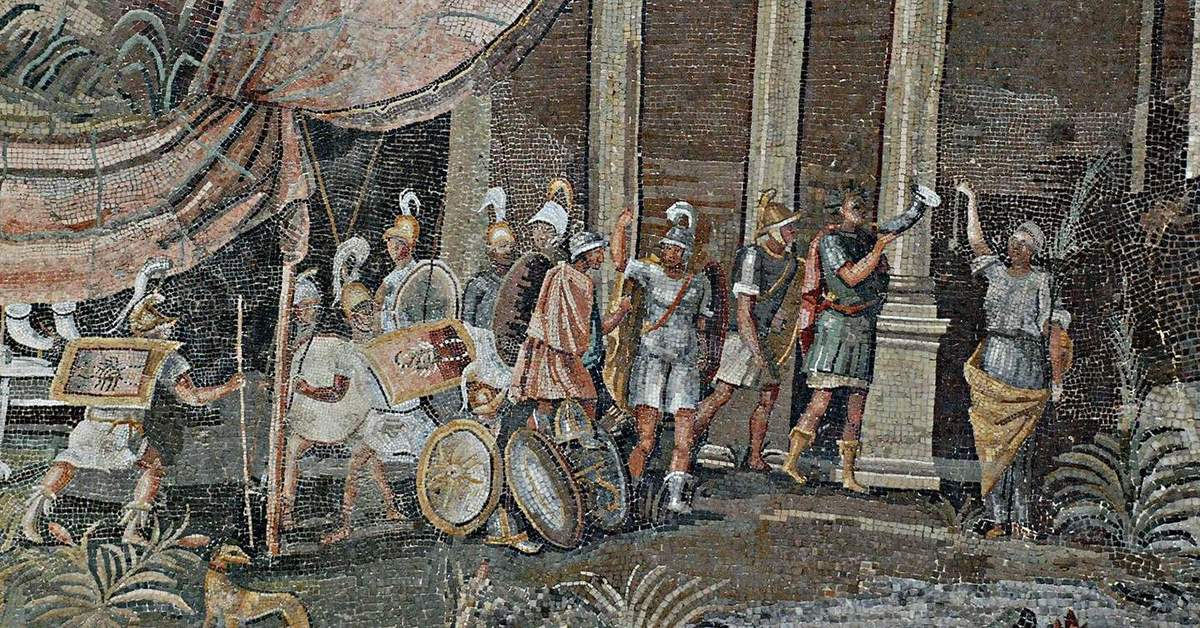
The Nile mosaic of Palestrina depicts Ptolemaic soldiers in the 2nd-century BCE.

The Ptolemaic military was originally composed of Greek soldiers who were given plots of farmland in Egypt as compensation for their service, in a system called cleruchy. Under Ptolemy I, personnel from the defunct Late Period Egyptian army were integrated into the Ptolemaic army, navy and police. Throughout the Ptolemaic period, the majority of soldiers serving in military roles were Greeks, while Egyptians served in smaller numbers.

The phylakitai were a separate body from the army, but were organized in a similar manner. They were professional, career officers who had been voluntarily recruited. The low-ranking phylakitai were recruited from both Greeks and Egyptians, but the highest administrative police officials were mostly Greeks. These Greek officials acted as intermediaries between the Ptolemaic royal administration and the Egyptian police officers who served the general populace.

Under the cleruchic land system, phylakitai received allotments of between 10 and 24 arouras (6.7–16 acres (2.7–6.5 ha)) of land, substantially less than the amount given to cavalry or infantrymen in the army. They also earned higher wages than average farm workers and were given special exemptions from certain taxes. The police were funded through a tax called the phylakitikon. Police corruption is known to have existed in Ptolemaic Egypt, but appears to have been relatively uncommon.

The organizational hierarchy of the phylakitai included the archiphylakitai, who held responsibilities analogous to modern police chiefs and had jurisdiction over a specific settlement. The epistates phylakiton was a higher-level official who held jurisdiction over police functions within an entire nome, and received reports from the archiphylakitai within their nome.

== Roles and responsibilities ==
Phylakitai served as the standing police force of Ptolemaic Egypt, operating in both the cities and the countryside. They were responsible for a wide array of law enforcement functions, including arresting suspected criminals and sentencing them for their crimes. Civilians petitioned phylakitai in order to report crimes and request an investigation into wrongdoing; most of these requests related to property damage, theft, or violence. Phylakitai were empowered to investigate crimes and damages, including questioning witnesses and confiscating property.

Phylakitai were stationed as guards at important locations such as roadways, construction sites, vineyards, and orchards. They also served varied roles outside of their responsibilities as police officers. They were sometimes tasked with agricultural functions, such as distributing grain and seed to villagers or collecting tax arrears from farmers. They were sometimes used as couriers for official correspondence.

== Sources ==
=== Books ===
- Bagnall, Roger S. (2006). Hellenistic and Roman Egypt: Sources and Approaches. Aldershot: Ashgate Publishing. ISBN 978-0-7546-5906-8 – via Google Books.
- Bauschatz, John (2013). Law and Enforcement in Ptolemaic Egypt. New York: Cambridge University Press. ISBN 978-1-107-03713-7.
- Chauveau, Michel (2000). Egypt in the Age of Cleopatra: History and Society Under the Ptolemies. Translated by Lorton, David. Ithaca, New York: Cornell University Press. ISBN 0-8014-3597-8.
- Clarysse, Willy; Thompson, Dorothy J. (2006). Counting the People in Hellenistic Egypt: Volume 2, Historical Studies. Cambridge: Cambridge University Press. ISBN 978-0-521-83839-9 – via Google Books.
- Fischer-Bovet, Christelle (2014). Army and Society in Ptolemaic Egypt. Cambridge: Cambridge University Press. ISBN 978-1-1399-91858 – via Google Books.
- Fuhrmann, Christopher J. (2012). Policing the Roman Empire: Soldiers, Administration, and Public Order. New York City: Oxford University Press. ISBN 978-0-19-973784-0 – via Google Books.
- Johstono, Paul (2020). The Army of Ptolemaic Egypt 323–204 BC: An Institutional and Operational History. Barnsley, UK: Pen and Sword Books. ISBN 978-1-47383-383-8.
- Manning, J. G. (2012). The Last Pharaohs: Egypt Under the Ptolemies, 305-30 BC. Princeton, New Jersey: Princeton University Press. ISBN 978-0-691-15638-5.

=== Academic articles ===
- Bauschatz, John (2007). "The Strong Arm of the Law? Police Corruption in Ptolemaic Egypt". The Classical Journal. 103 (1). Natchitoches, Louisiana: Classical Association of the Middle West and South: 13–39. ISSN 0009-8353. JSTOR 30038657.
