= Kerkeosiris =

3rd-century BC village in Egypt

Name of Kerkeosiris in hieroglyphics

Kerkeosiris was a village in ancient Egypt. It is notable for its archives of papyri, which are an important source of information about life in Ptolemaic Egypt.

== Description ==
The village was named after the Egyptian deity Osiris, and had shrines to many Greek and Egyptian deities. It was founded in the early Ptolemaic period, possibly the 3rd century BCE, for the purpose of being a settlement for Greek soldiers in the Ptolemaic army. The village was about 20 hectares (50 acres) in size but its territory included 1,300 hectares (3,200 acres) of mostly farmland. It was located in the Faiyum Oasis and was irrigated by a canal that connected to the Bahr Yussef branch of the Nile, since the Nile's floodwaters did not reach Kerkeosiris. More than half of the cultivated land in Kerkeosiris was used to grow wheat, but other crops like lentils and vetch were also grown. It produced far more grain than was needed to sustain its own population, and was an exporter of food. Other important industries were animal husbandry and honey production.

In the 2nd century BCE, it had a population of approximately 1,520 people.

The exact location of the village is currently unknown. Most information about it comes from 2nd-century BCE papyri from the village that were found by archaeologists in the nearby city of Tebtunis. This Tebtunis archive was discovered by archaeologists in 1900, and contain the archives of the scribe Menches. Over 130 of the papyri discovered were land registries and other administrative documents from the village. The existence of discovered land registries allows archaeologists to study the demographics of the village in detail. The papyri provide the most detailed information about life in the Ptolemaic Egyptian countryside in existence. In addition to providing information about the inner workings of Kerkeosiris, the surviving papyri from the village also provide unparalleled information about the administration and government of Ptolemaic Egypt.
