= Cleruchy =

Specialized type of colony established by Athens

A cleruchy (Greek: κληρουχία, klēroukhia; also klerouchy and kleruchy) in Classical Greece, was a specialized type of colony established by Athens. The term comes from the Greek word κληροῦχος, klēroukhos, literally "lot-holder". Cleruchies also existed in Hellenistic kingdoms like the Ptolemaic, Seleucid, and Attalid kingdoms.

== History ==
=== Classical Greece ===
Normally, Greek colonies were politically independent; they would have a special relationship with the mother city (the metropolis), but would otherwise be independent entities. Cleruchies were significantly different. The settlers or cleruchs would retain their Athenian citizenship, and the community remained a political dependency of Athens – a position reinforced by installing institutions of local government based on Athenian models, such as the council on Samos.

According to Plutarch, cleruchies were assigned to poor Athenian citizens, who would then live overseas while retaining their Athenian citizenship. However, epigraphical evidence suggests that Athenian cleruchs were more commonly wealthy, and continued to live in Athens while slaves worked on their overseas estates. Cleruchies thereby became a significant source of private wealth in Athens – the 3,000 kleroi on Lesbos provided 100 talents a year, according to Thucydides.

The first cleruchy is thought to have been Salamis, captured by Athens from Megara in the 6th century BC. Other cleruchies were established on the Thracian Chersonese following its recapture from the Persian Empire after the Greco-Persian Wars of the 5th century BC, and at Chalcis following that city's defeat in a war with Athens. During the period of the Delian League and the Second Athenian League (5th–4th century BC), many more cleruchies were created by Athens such as on Samos. Athens' system of cleruchies reached its height in the late fifth century, at which point it stretched as far east as Amisos on the Black Sea. This network of cleruchies was lost at the end of the Peloponnesian War, and never reached this extent again, although some cleruchies were re-established in the fourth century, for example at Lemnos and Samos.

=== Hellenistic period ===
Theocritus, Idyll XIV

Ptolemy is the best paymaster a free man could have

Several Hellenistic kingdoms, particularly the Ptolemaic Kingdom, established a system of cleruchies in their lands. Under this system, Greeks were recruited into the Ptolemaic army, and in exchange given land grants (Greek: κλῆροι, romanized: klēroi) in Egypt, which they lived on during peacetime. These settlers were known as klērūchoi (Greek: κληροῦχοι) or katoikoi (Greek: κάτοικοι). The cleruchy system served multiple uses, such as establishing a Greek presence in Egypt which helped Hellenise it, creating a reserve of soldiers who could be called on at any time, and contributing to land reclamation in the Faiyum, since soldiers were often given marginal land and required to cultivate it.

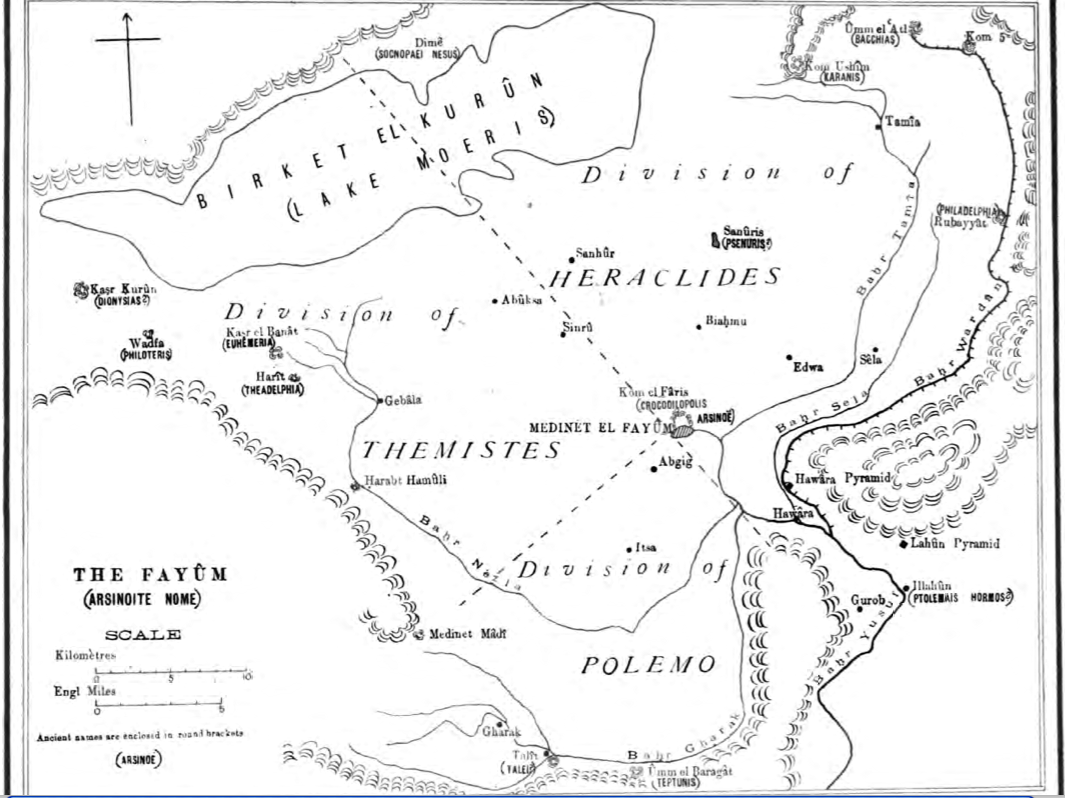
Map of Fayum from 1895, identifying locations of some Ptolemaic settlements

The Ptolemaic cleruchy system had precedents in both classical Greece and in Egypt, where, according to Herodotus, a system of 12-aroura land grants for soldiers existed under Amasis II. The first Ptolemaic klērūchoi were Ptolemy I's roughly 6,500 Macedonian soldiers. During the Wars of the Diadochi, Ptolemy expanded his army using prisoners of war and defectors from armies that opposed him. For example, after the Battle of Gaza in 312 BC, Ptolemy settled 8,000 prisoners in Egypt as reservists. The most common regions of origin of klērūchoi were Macedonia, Cyrenaica, mainland Greece, the Aegean, Asia Minor and Thrace. The Ptolemies had a preference for Macedonian soldiers, as they considered Macedonia their homeland. Klērūchoi were settled at strategic locations throughout Egypt, but with a particularly high concentration in the Arsinoite, Oxyrhynchite, and Herakleopolite nomes. In the mid-third century BC, up to 29% of the adult population in the Arsinoite nome (i.e. the Faiyum) was composed of klērūchoi and their descendants (who were called epigonoi). The Ptolemies conducted extensive land reclamation projects in the Faiyum, settling it with Greeks and with Egyptians from other parts of the country. These settlers established villages such as Philadelphia, Theadelphia, Karanis, Soknopaiou Nesos, Euhemeria, Philoteris and many others.

The sizes of the klēroi varied according the soldiers' ranks. In the 3rd century BC, native Egyptian machimoi received a klēros of 5 arouras, regular infantrymen received 30, and regular cavalrymen received 100. One soldier (possibly a hipparch) is known to have had a klēros of 1306 arouras. A soldier could be described by the size of his land, as in "100-aroura man" (Greek: ἑκατοντάρουρος), "30-aroura man" (Greek: τριακοντάρουρος), and so on. In Middle Egypt, the land was free of rent, and in Upper Egypt it was not liable to the epigraphē tax. However, by the 2nd century BC, 100-aroura plots had been replaced by 80-aroura ones. As klēroi began to be more widely granted, not only to soldiers but also to phylakitai, ephodoi, and others, the size and quality of the land granted declined, and the cleruchs gradually lost their tax advantages. Words like "100-aroura man" and "30-aroura man" came to simply denote titles, and did not always reflect the actual size of a soldier's plot of land. At the same time, the ranks attained and plots of land given to native Egyptian soldiers increased, especially after the machimoi proved themselves at the Battle of Raphia in 217 BC.

Various communities of cleruchs established ethnic enclaves (politeumata, singular politeuma) in Egypt. Attested politeumata include one for Cilicians, one for Boeotians (in Xois), one for Cretans, one for Jews (in Heracleopolis Magna), one for Idumaeans (in Memphis), and one for Phrygians. According to Josephus, Alexander the Great had settled Jews in Alexandria as a reward for their military service, and communities of Jewish soldiers are attested in Egypt long before then, such as in the Elephantine papyri. One historian theorised, based on the use of military terminology in the Septuagint, that some of its translators may have been Jewish cleruchs with military experience.

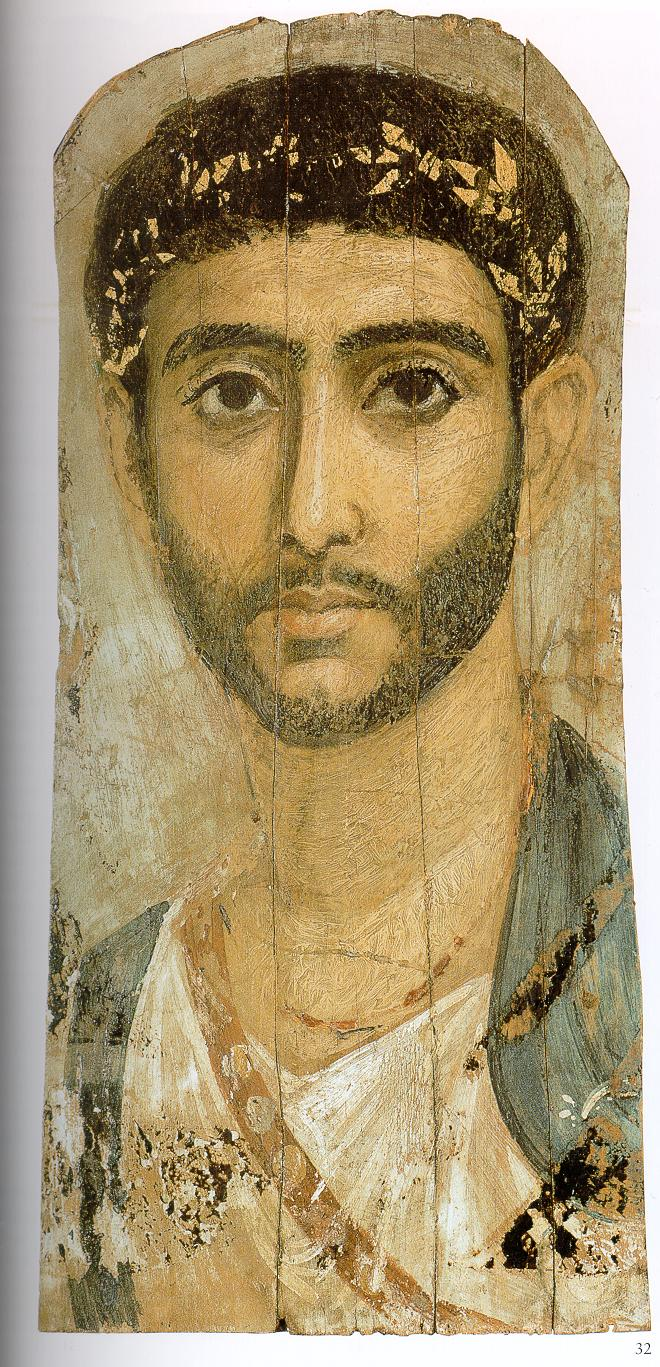
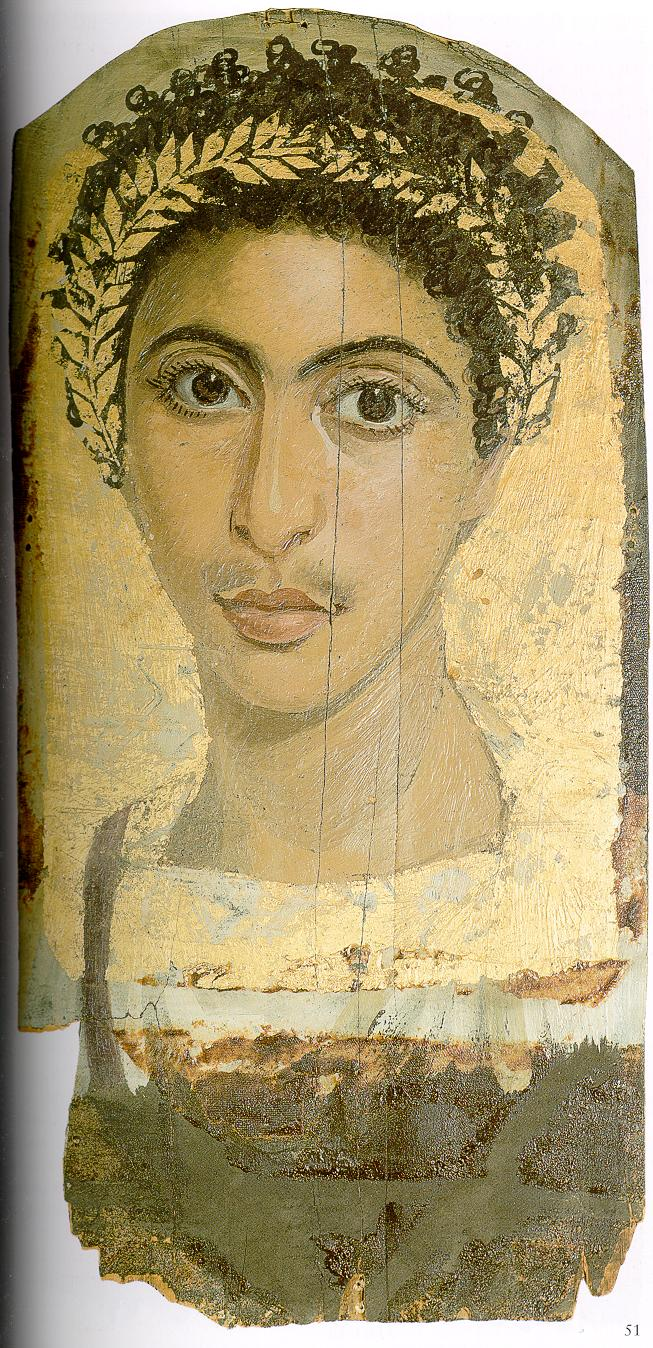
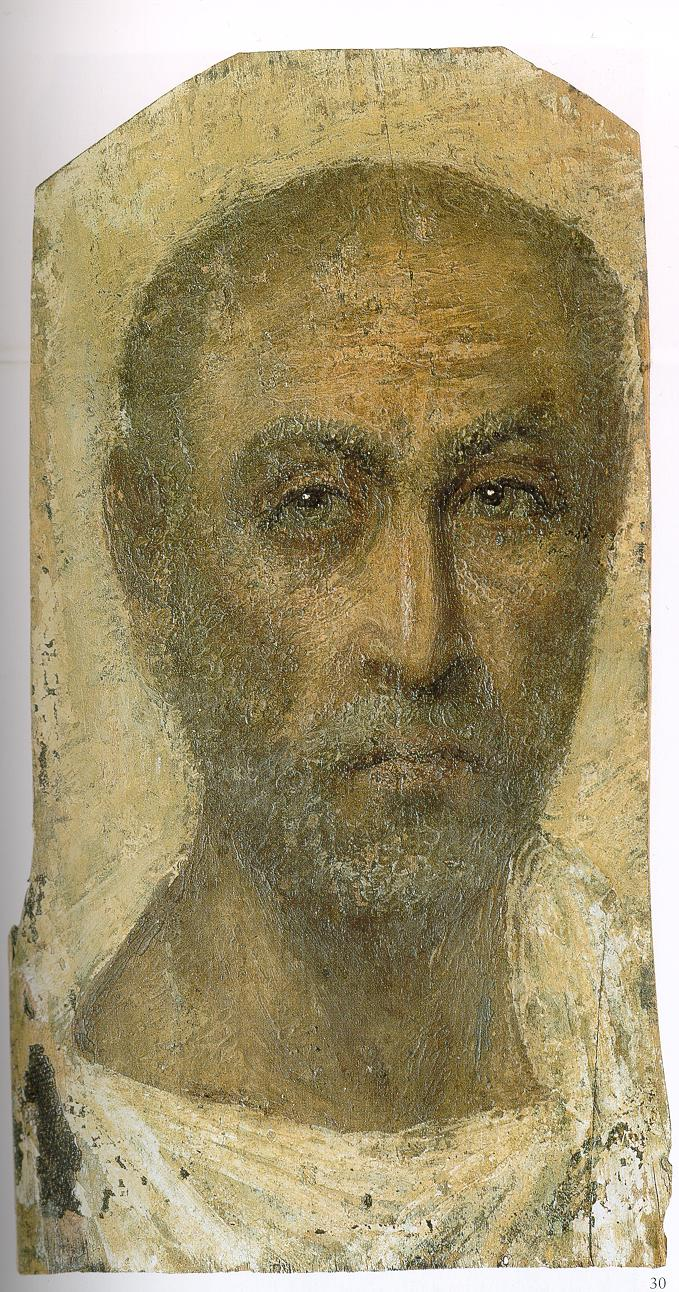
The naturalistic Fayum mummy portraits show the diversity of Egyptians in the Roman period.

The cleruchs' descendants, the epigonoi, intermarried with the local Egyptian population and adopted Egyptian religious beliefs, so that by the Roman period much of the "Greek" population of Faiyum was composed of either Hellenized Egyptians or people of mixed Egyptian-Greek origins. The Roman authorities viewed them as Egyptians despite their own self-identification as Greeks. However, a group of epigonoi called "the 6,475 katoikoi of the Greek men of the Arsinoite nomos" was given a privileged tax status by the Romans. Additionally, some cleruchic land was still categorised and taxed differently two centuries into Roman rule. The Fayum mummy portraits, which blend Egyptian and Greek traditions, are a testament to the multi-ethnic society that arose in the Faiyum from the synthesis of Egyptian and Greek culture.

== Works cited ==
- Bagnall, R.S. (2000). Walker, Susan (ed.). Ancient Faces: Mummy Portraits in Roman Egypt (PDF). Metropolitan Museum of Art Publications. New York: Routledge.
- Bevan, Edwyn (1927). "V". The House of Ptolemy A History of Hellenistic Egypt under the Ptolemaic Dynasty. Ares Publishers. ISBN 9780890055366.
- Fischer-Bovet, Christelle (2012). "Katoikoi". In Bagnall, Roger; Brodersen, Kai; Champion, Craige; Erskine, Andrew; Huebner, Sabine (eds.). The Encyclopedia of Ancient History (first ed.). Blackwell Publishing. doi:10.1002/9781444338386.wbeah07051.
- Fischer-Bovet, Christelle (2015). "The Ptolemaic Army". Oxford Handbook Topics in Classical Studies. Oxford University Press. ISBN 978-0199935390.
- Hornblower, Simon; Spawforth, Antony (1996). The Oxford Classical Dictionary (III ed.). Oxford University Press. ISBN 978-0198661726.
- Joosten, Jan (2007). "Language as Symptom: Linguistic Clues to the Social Background of the Seventy" (PDF). Textus. 23: 69–80.
- Manning, Joseph (2003). Land and Power in Ptolemaic Egypt: The Structure of Land Tenure. Cambridge University Press. ISBN 978-0511069994.
- Moreno, Alfonso (2013), "Cleruchy", in Bagnall, Roger S.; Broderson, Kai; Champion, Craige B.; Erskine, Andrew; Huebner, Sabine R. (eds.), Encyclopedia of Ancient History, Blackwell
- Sänger, Patrick (2015). "Military immigration and the emergence of cultural or ethnic identities: The case of Ptolemaic Egypt". The Journal of Juristic Papyrology. 45: 229–254.
- Schubert, Paul (2019). "Transmission of Cleruchic Land: A Model to Describe the Procedure". Archiv für Papyrusforschung und verwandte Gebiete. 65 (2): 280–316. doi:10.1515/apf-2019-0014.
- Thompson, Dorothy (2019). "Cleruchs, Egypt". In Brodersen, Kai; Erskine, Andrew; Hollander, David (eds.). The Encyclopedia of Ancient History. John Wiley & Sons. doi:10.1002/9781444338386.wbeah22057.pub2.
- van Daal, Jan M.; van Oppen de Ruiter, Branko F. (2022). "The Young Lady in Pink. New Light on the Life and Afterlife of an Ancient Portrait". Studies in Ancient Art and Civilisation. 26: 125–162. doi:10.12797/SAAC.26.2022.26.07.
