= Allaria =

Coordinates: 35°22′22″N 24°35′49″E

Allaria (Ancient Greek: Ἀλλαρία) was a town and polis (city-state) of ancient Crete. Allaria minted coins bearing on the obverse the head of Athena Pallas, and on the reverse a figure of Heracles standing, some of which have been preserved. Cnopias of Allaria, a native, commanded Cretan mercenaries hired by the Ptolemaic Army at the Battle of Raphia (217 BCE).

Its site is tentatively located near Khamalevri.
