= Stationarius =

Stationarius may refer to:

- a type of librarius; see Manuscript culture
- Stationarius (Roman military)
