= Cleopatra: Beyond the Myth =

1998 book by Michel Chauveau

- Author: Michel Chauveau
- Translator: David Lorton
- Publisher: Levi, Cornell University Press
- Publication date: 1998
- English publication date: 2002

Cleopatra: Beyond the Myth (originally published as Cléopâtre, au-delà du mythe) is a non-fiction book by Michel Chauveau.

== Synopsis ==
The book discusses the life and reign of Cleopatra as reconstructed from surviving historical sources, as well as Cleopatra's reception in historical memory.

== Publication and translation. ==
Originally published in French in 1998, an English translation by David Lorton was published by Cornell University Press in 2002.

== Reception ==
The book was generally well received, earning praise for dispelling myths associated with Cleopatra. Historian Prudence Jones, in the Bryn Mawr Classical Review, praised the book's careful analysis of historical sources and its discussion of her reception in later periods. Foy Scalf, writing for the Journal of Near Eastern Studies, praised the book's clarity, conciseness, and handling of Egyptian source material in addition to Classical texts. John Mosher in a review for History, wrote that it "chops away at the vines of Cleopatra legend to lay bare what is known about her from surviving records."

A review by archaeologist Susan Walker, published in the International Journal of the Classical Tradition, was more critical, noting that Chauveau's work did include many of his own assumptions and personal interpretations despite ostensibly seeking to dispel myths. In particular, Walker noted his harsh attitude towards Ptolemy XII Auletes' reign and his theories about the mother of Cleopatra.
