= Egypt in the Age of Cleopatra =

Book by Michel Chauveau

- Author: Michel Chauveau
- Translator: David Lorton
- Language: French
- Publisher: Hachette, Cornell University Press
- Publication date: 1997
- English publication date: 2000

Egypt in the Age of Cleopatra (originally published as L'Egypte au temps de Cléopâtre) is a non-fiction book by French historian Michel Chauveau.

== Synopsis ==
The book is a social history of the Ptolemaic Kingdom between the late 3rd and 1st Century BC. It draws heavily on Demotic Egyptian and Greek papyrological evidence.

== Publication and translations ==
The book was originally published by Hachette in 1997. An English translation by David Lorton was published by Cornell University Press in 2000.

== Reception ==
The book garnered a mostly positive reception for Chauveau's use of textual sources and its exploration of domestic changes which occurred within Egypt. Helen Strudwick, reviewing a set of translations by Lorton, wrote that Egypt in the Age of Cleopatra was "a very readable and entertaining overview" of the period.

Jane Rowlandson, writing for the Classical Bulletin, praised the book's approach to Ptolemaic history from Chauveau's perspective as an Egyptologist as previous works on the subject often focused exclusively on Classical sources. Marjorie Venit, in the Bryn Mawr Classical Review, recommended it as an expansive and informative text for general audiences, while criticizing Chauveau's unfavourable perspective on the Ptolemaic dynasty. However, both Rowlandson and Venit were critical of the book's layout and use of subheadings, which they felt made the book unnecessarily confusing.
