= David Lorton =

David Lorton was an Egyptologist and translator, most well known for his work translating European research into English.

== Career ==
In 1976, Lorton received a fellowship from the American Council of Learned Societies for his work in Thebes, Egypt. Between the late 1990s and early 2000s, Lorton translated a number of books by European historians and Egyptologists into English for Cornell University Press. Many of these were on the topic of ancient Egyptian religion. His work as a translator was generally respected by critics, with Monica Bontty of Bryn Mawr Classical Review noting his proficiency at "interpreting the complexity of the original German, while still retaining its integrity and eloquence." However another Bryn Mawr review by Joshua Katz was more critical, writing that he did a poor job translating Zivie-Coche's Sphinx from the original French.

Lorton coedited Essays in Egyptology in Honor of Hans Goedicke with Betsy M. Bryan in 2000.

== Bibliography ==
=== Author and editor ===
- Ed. Essays in Egyptology in Honor of Hans Goedicke. 2000.

=== Translator ===
- Thomas Schneider. Ancient Egypt in 101 Questions and Answers. 2013.
- Florian Ebeling. The Secret History of Hermes Trismegistus. 2007.
- Françoise Dunand and Roger Lichtenberg. Mummies and death in Ancient Egypt. 2007.
- Jan Assmann. Death and Salvation in Ancient Egypt. 2006.
- Françoise Dunand and Christiane Zivie‐Coche. Gods and Men in Egypt: 3000 BCE 395 CE. 2004.
- Pascal Vernus. Affairs and scandals in ancient Egypt. 2003.
- Christiane Zivie‐Coche. Sphinx. 2003.
- Michel Chauveau. Cleopatra: Beyond the Myth. 2002.
- Claude Traunecker. The Gods of Egypt. 2001.
- Jan Assmann. The Search for God in Ancient Egypt. 2001.
- Karol Mysliwiec. The Twilight of Ancient Egypt. 2001.
- Serge Sauneron. The Priests of Ancient Egypt. 2001.
- Erik Hornung. The Secret Lore of Egypt. 2001.
- Michel Chauveau. Egypt in the Age of Cleopatra. 2000.
- Erik Hornung. Akhenaton and the Religion of Light. 1999.
- Erik Hornung. History of Ancient Egypt. 1999.
- Guillemette Andreu's Egypt in the Age of the Pyramids. 1997.
