= Tebtunis archive =

Collection of papyrus texts housed at the University of California, Berkeley

The Tebtunis archive (officially, The Tebtunis Papyri Collection) of Bancroft Library at the University of California, Berkeley is the largest collection of texts on papyrus in the Americas.

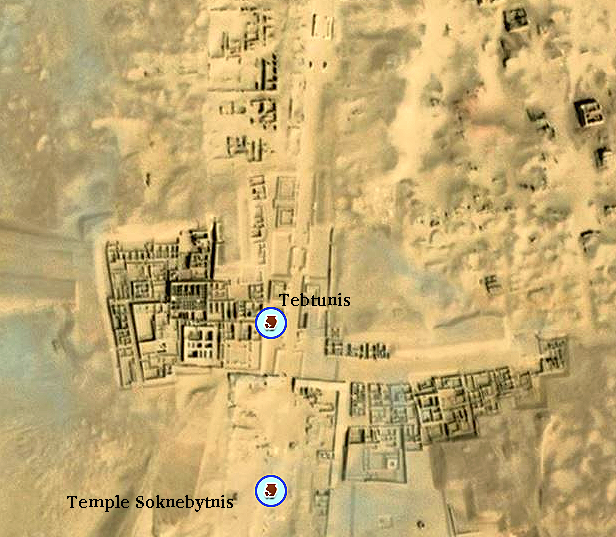
Tebtunis and Temple Soknebytnis, Faiyum Governorate

The Tebtunis papyri are written in either Demotic Egyptian or Koine Greek and were found during a single expedition led by Bernard Pyne Grenfell and Arthur Surridge Hunt, two British papyrologists in the winter of 1899/1900 at the village of ancient Tebtunis (near modern Umm-el-Baragat), Egypt. The papyri can be divided into three groups based on their provenance: texts from the crocodile mummies, the town and from the temple of Soknebtunis, and the cartonnage of human mummies. A total of 1093 fragments of the Tebtunian papyri are registered in museums, which have been read and published in Greek in university publications.

Grenfell and Hunt published 1,094 translated texts from the archive in a series of volumes published between 1902 and 1938. These papyri represented less than 5% of the 30,000 fragments that Grenfell and Hunt excavated.

Since 1995, the university has been a part of the Advanced Papyrological Information System (APIS); through APIS it has received grants from the National Endowment for the Humanities to conserve, catalogue and digitize the papyri.

== Papyri wrapped in mummies ==
=== Crocodile mummy texts ===
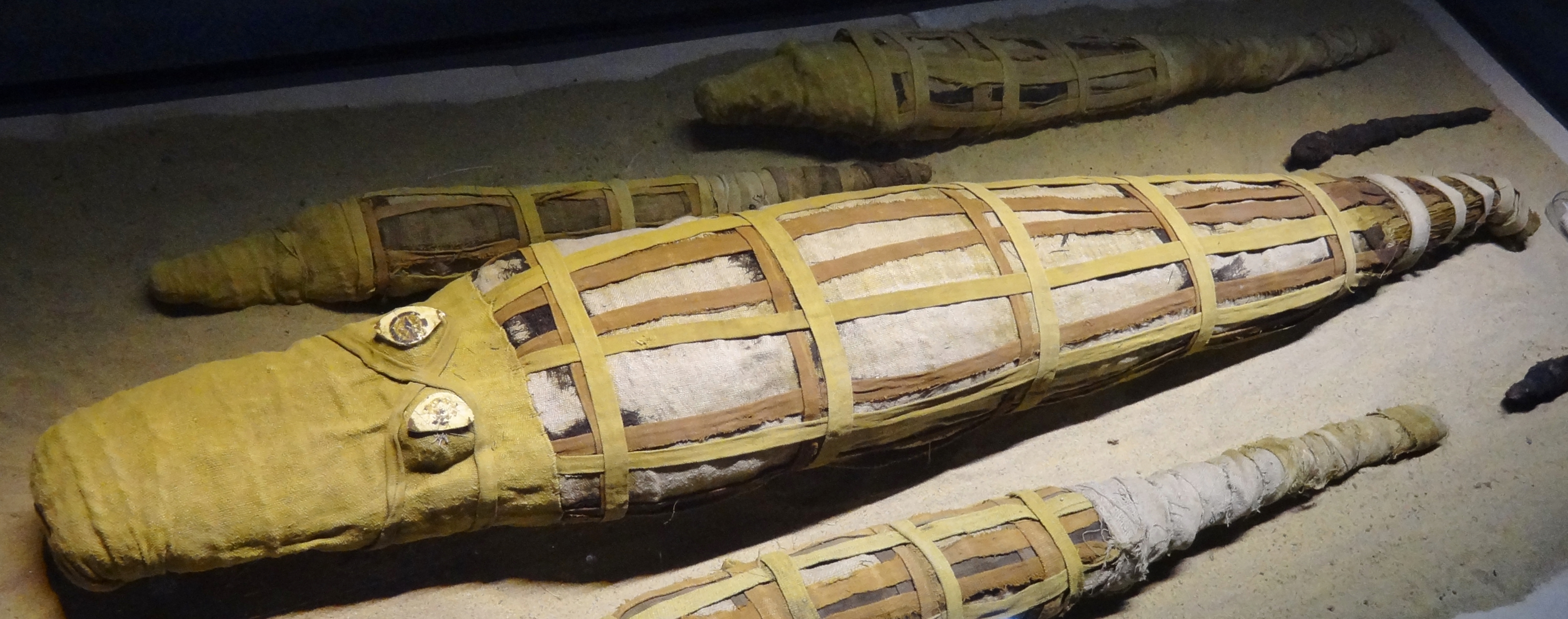
Crocodile mummies, Museum Kom Ombo

A large portion of the Tebtunis crocodile mummies come from the archive of the komogrammateus (Note: commissioned writer) or village scribe, of the nearby village, Kerkeosiris (Note: House of Osiris), at the end of the 2nd century BC. The "Menches papers" (Note: Papyri 9-20, p. 70-91) make up the biggest part of the Crocodile Papyri. These papers are divided into two groups, administrative documents and correspondence. The administrative documents are long reports that detail the state of affairs of every square meter of the area surrounding Kerkeosiris. The correspondence section essentially includes official letters that were addressed to Menches by his superiors and peers in the Ptolemaic bureaucracy.

Letter of Manches to Horus
To Horus, greeting. In the 1st the current month at about the eleventh hour a disturbance occurred in the village, and running out we found a crowd of villagers who had come to the assistance of Polemon, who is performing the duties of epistates (Note: superintendent or overseer) of the village. When we inquired into the matter, they informed us that Apollodorus and his son Maron had assaulted Polemon, that Apollodorus had escaped, but Maron had been put in prison…,(Papyri 15, 114 BC)

There also exists a separate group of texts made up of forty-five private documents from the first half of the 1st century BC. These texts were found in five crocodile mummies that had been buried next to each other.

=== Soknebtunis texts ===
Grenfell and Hunt's first excavation in 1899 at the Temple of Tebtunis found 200 papyri. The papyri from the town are the most diverse, and they have provided us with literary fragments, including contracts, petitions, declarations, and tax receipts. Most of these papyri concern the Soknebtunis's priests of the crocodile god, Sobek, the central deity worshiped in the temples. These documents reveal what life was like for Tebtunis priests when Egypt was under Roman rule.

=== Cartonnage of human mummy texts ===
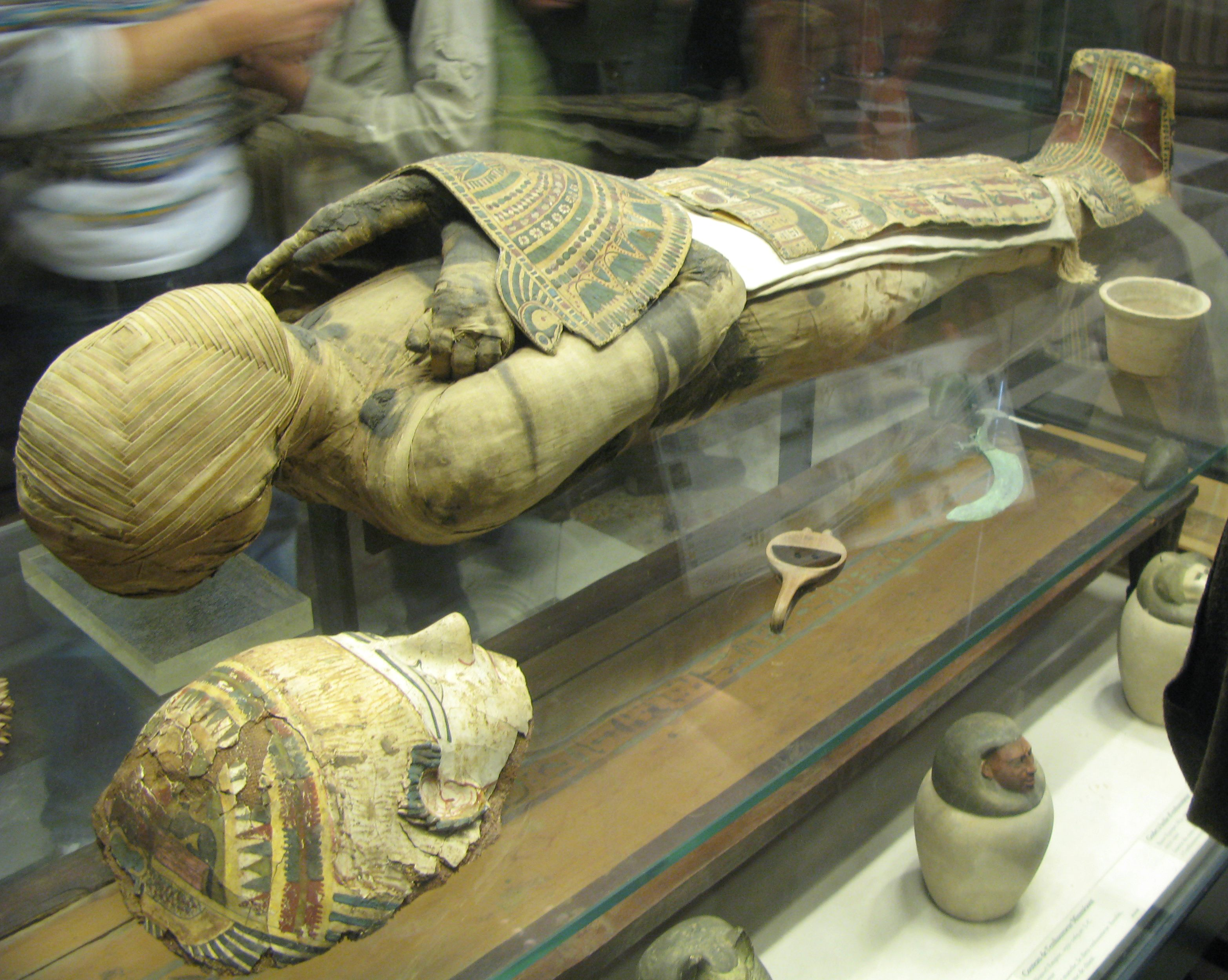
Egyptian mummy, Ptolemaic period, 3rd - 2nd century BC

Grenfell and Hunt's second excavation, at the southwest necropolis, unearthed fifty mummy coffins where used papyri had been recycled in the manufacture. The papyri from the cartonnage covering human mummies date from the 3rd and 2nd centuries BC. Most of these documents can be traced back to Oxyrhynchus (modern-day El-Bahnasa), a small village to the north of Tebtunis. These texts are from village officials, the village scribe, and the guards. The general society, far from the hectic palace of the ruler and the vibrant life in Alexandria, was guided by established legal relations that evidenced the function of the administrative apparatus, taxes were collected, trade contracts were concluded, and marriages were concluded in civil coexistence. The systems of state administration and economy, established already during the reign of Ptolemy I Soter and his two successors, proved viable and were respected by subsequent generations and broad sections of the population for their benefit, in accordance with the belief in the order of Maat. A collection of translations of the aforementioned demotic-written papyri and ostraca, translated into Greek, which are dated to the reigns of Ptolemy IX and X, (116- 88 BC) is reported by Grenfell.

Marriage contract
The husband renounces bigamy and other forms of infidelity and is forbidden to move into a house to which his wife has no right, or to alienate her personal property from her out of ill will or in any other way, regardless of her benefit. The wife, on the other hand, is not allowed to stay out of the house overnight or day without informing her husband, or to enter into other relationships, or generally to damage the reputation of the house.
The contract is attested on the back by the names of six witnesses, the names of the contracting parties are at the bottom, and it is provided with the seals of the six witnesses.(Papyri 104, 92 BC)

Tax on income for work.
Ischyrion greets Melas(e) son of Pnepheros, one of the priests of Tebtunis. I certify that you paid the tax on work done in the 4th year (namely) 8 drachmas in silver and 1200 drachmas in copper. Given in the 5th year Thoth 30 (January 30). Paid to Petesuchus(e). Dated to the reign of Ptolemy XII. (Papyri 102, 77 BC)

=== New documents from the Tebtunis archives ===
Two papyri have been found that provide evidence regarding two officials, Apion and Kronion, who were in charge of the village record office in Tebtunis during the first half of the 1st century AD. This provides us with more information about certain events in the village of Tebtunis. These documents have been published in two volumes of Papyri from Tebtunis. The village record was directed by Apion from 7 AD to at least 25 AD and by 43 AD it was under the direction of Kronion, son of Apion, until 52 AD.
Other papyri collections were unearthed in Tebtunis 1931 by archaeologist Carlo Anti These are located in Florence and part in the Copenhagen museum. They have been gradually restored, read and published.

== Lexicological significance ==
The Tebtunis papyri frequently provide also useful light on the usage of Koine Greek in the New Testament period. For example, the verb authentein, "to have authority", a hapax legomenon in the New Testament, is documented three times in relation to "bookkeepers having authority" in P.Fam.Tebt.15 (up to 114-15 AD). Texts from the Tebtunis papyri are referenced in both LSJ and BDAG lexicons, as well.
