= The Search for God in Ancient Egypt =

1984 book by Jan Assmann

- Author: Jan Assmann
- Original title: Ägypten. Theologie und Frömmigkeit einer frühen Hochkultur
- Translator: David Lorton
- Language: German
- Subject: ancient Egyptian theology
- Publisher: Kohlhammer Verlag
- Publication date: 1984
- Publication place: Germany
- English publication date: 2001
- Pages: 287
- ISBN: 3170083716

The Search for God in Ancient Egypt (German: Ägypten. Theologie und Frömmigkeit einer frühen Hochkultur, lit. 'Egypt: Theology and Piety of an Early High Culture') is a 1984 book by the German egyptologist Jan Assmann. It is a study of ancient Egyptian theology, relying on a wide range of sources.

The book had significant influence on subsequent academic study of Egyptian religion and theology. A revised version was published in English translation by David Lorton in 2001. Kasia Szpakowska wrote in Electronic Antiquity in 2003 that the English translation is "masterful" and although "it is not a beginner's book, it should be read by anyone seriously interested in Egyptian religion or the study of religions in general".
