= TT410 =

Theban tomb

Theban tomb TT410
- Burial site of Mutirdis
- Location: El-Assasif, Theban Necropolis
- Discovered: 1970s
- ← Previous; TT409 Next → TT411

The Theban Tomb TT410 is located in El-Assasif, part of the Theban Necropolis, on the west bank of the Nile, opposite to Luxor. The tomb belongs to Mutirdis, the chief companion lady of the God's Wife of Amun during the time of Nitocris I, and Psamtik I of the 26th Dynasty. The tomb is located in the area of the royal tombs in the Valley of the Kings. The nearby monumental tombs of the Late Period have been noted for their special features.

== Family ==
Mutirdis was the daughter of the God's Father and Beloved of the God Pahabu. In the tomb two mothers are mentioned. The lady of the house Asetenpermesut is likely her birth mother. The Chief female attendant of the Divine Adoratrice Qapamaaupairdis is also said to be her mother, but this lady may be an adoptive parent who later passed on her position as chief female attendant to Mutirdis. The inscriptions in the tomb do not mention a husband, but Mutirdis is said to have had a son and three daughters. Her son was a chamberlain to the Divine Adoratrice, and her daughters all served as attendants.

== Tomb ==
The tomb is fully decorated and includes biographical texts, including on the pylons. On the pylons and in the sunken court Mutirdis is shown almost life-size. At the western side of the burial chamber, the decorated ceiling features the painting of Nut from the Book of Nut. The head of Nut is located at the entrance of the tomb from the west. Due to the collapse of the ceiling, the Nut painting is heavily damaged. The eastern part of the ceiling has the representation of the Book of the Night, which is also aligned in a westerly direction to the entrance.

== See also ==
- List of Theban Tombs
