= TT409 =

Theban tomb

Theban tomb TT409
- Burial site of Samut called Kyky
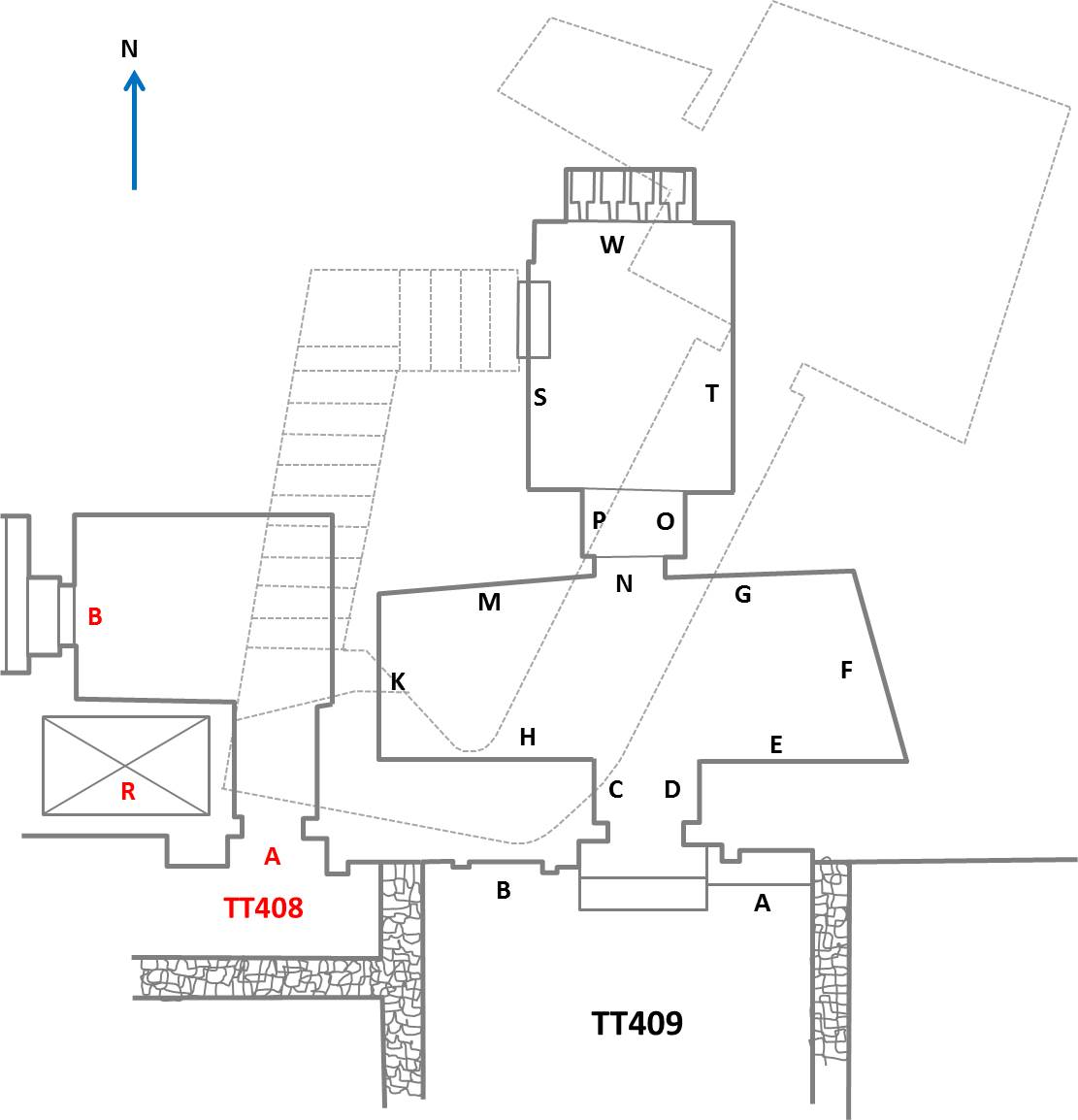
- Plans of TT408 and TT409

- Location within Egypt
- Location: El-Assasif, Theban Necropolis
- Discovered: 1950s
- ← Previous; TT408 Next → TT410

G39 Z1 t G14 called k i i O50 Z4
Samut called Kyky
in hieroglyphs
Era: New Kingdom
(1550–1069 BC)

The Theban Tomb TT409 is located in El-Assasif, part of the Theban Necropolis, on the west bank of the Nile, opposite to Luxor. It is the burial place of the ancient Egyptian Samut called Kyky (or Kiki), who was Accountant of Cattle of the Amun domain, during the reign of Ramesses II during the Nineteenth Dynasty.

== Tomb ==
The tomb was discovered as a result of the clearance of the Tomb of Kheruef in the 1950s.

The parents of Samut called Kyky are not known, but his wife Raiay is depicted in the tomb.

The plan of the tomb is conventional. The actual tomb is oriented to the north, bit the inscriptions create an orientation to the west. The courtyard of TT 409 belongs to the tomb of Bakenamun which is located right next to the tomb of Samut called Kyky. There may be other tombs located to the south, but if they exist they are buried at this point.

=== Facade ===
The facade of the tomb included two stela that flank the entrance. One depicts the deceased offering to gods Ra-Harakhti and Maat. A text with a hymn to Ra-Harakhti is included below the scene. The second stele shows Samut called Kyky and his wife Raiay offering to Osiris and Isis with another hymn to Ra-Harakhti below the scene.

=== Hall ===
The entrance to the hall includes further scenes with the couple adoring Ra-Harakhti, Maat, Osiris and Isis. A scene with a harpist in also included in the entrance way. The harpist is shown singing to the deceased and his wife.

On the western side of the Hall Samut is shown before the goddess Mut and a long hymn to Mut is included. Agricultural scenes as well as offerings of cattle to Amun-Ra are shown. In a scene including a kiosk, Ramesses II is shown adoring Amun-Ra.

On the eastern side of the hall The Book of Gates, a banquet and funeral procession is shown. In addition there is a judgement scene which includes Ammit and Samut and his wife before Osiris. In the funeral procession Raiay is shown bending over the coffin of her husband. The scenes also show the coffin on a ship. Two other boats with rowers are apparently towing the ship with the coffin.

=== Inner room ===
The inner room includes several scenes including: the raising of the Djed pillar, a tree goddess scene, and the transport of the mummy into the burial chamber. Six female mourners are shown in the latter scene. The mummy is being born by priests and further priests are shown, two of which are wearing an Anubis mask, and one a falcon mask.

At the back of the room is a niche containing four statues. Two of the statues are of Samut and his wife Raiay. The other two statues depict a man named Mery and a woman named Tutuia.

== See also ==
- List of Theban Tombs
