= TT411 =

Theban tomb

Theban tomb TT411
- Burial site of Psamtik-ty-erneneh
- Location within Egypt
- Location: El-Assasif, Theban Necropolis
- Discovered: 1960s
- ← Previous; TT410 Next → TT412

The Theban Tomb TT411 is located in El-Assasif, part of the Theban Necropolis, on the west bank of the Nile, opposite to Luxor. The tomb belongs to a man named Psamtik-ty-erneneh, whose occupation is not known. The tomb dates to the Saite period, and is built over the middle kingdom tomb of Intef.

The tomb was reused during the Ptolemaic Period. Finds from this period include an offering table from a priest named Aapekhti.

== See also ==
- List of Theban Tombs
