= Book of Nut =

Collection of ancient Egyptian astronomical texts

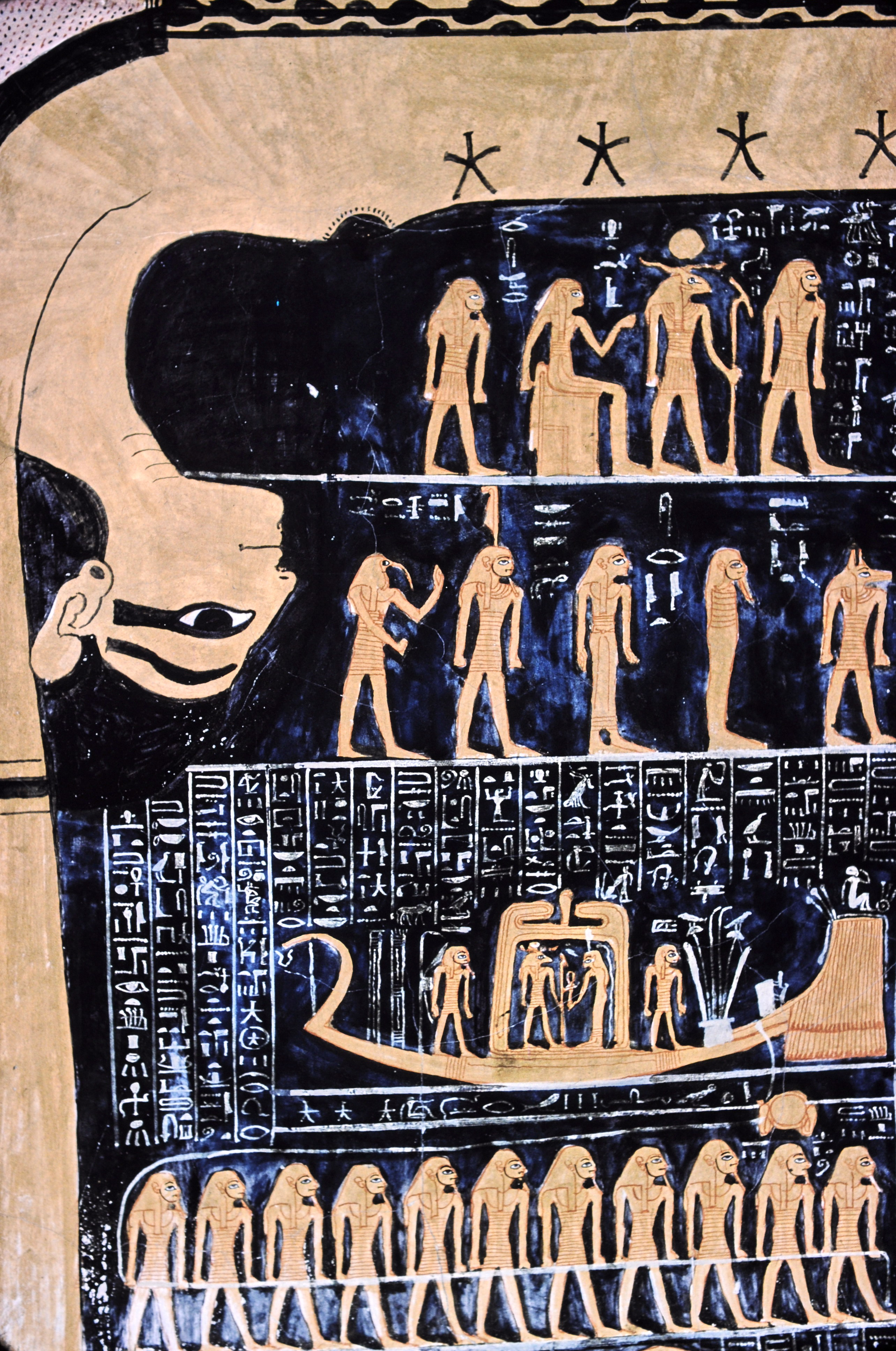
The sky goddess Nut and human figures representing stars and constellations from the star chart in the tomb of Ramses VI

The Book of Nut (original title: The Fundamentals of the Course of the Stars) is a collection of ancient Egyptian astronomical texts focusing on mythological subjects, cycles of the stars of the decans, and the movements of the moon, sun, and planets on sundials.

It is titled for the sky goddess Nut who is depicted in some copies of the text arching over the earth. She is supported by the god of the air Shu. Texts in the Book of Nut include material from different periods of Egyptian history.

The original name of the book, The Fundamentals of the Course of the Stars, was discovered by Alexandra von Lieven in one of the manuscript fragments and published in 2007. One of the major themes of the Book of Nut is the concept of sunrise as the mythological rebirth.

== Texts ==
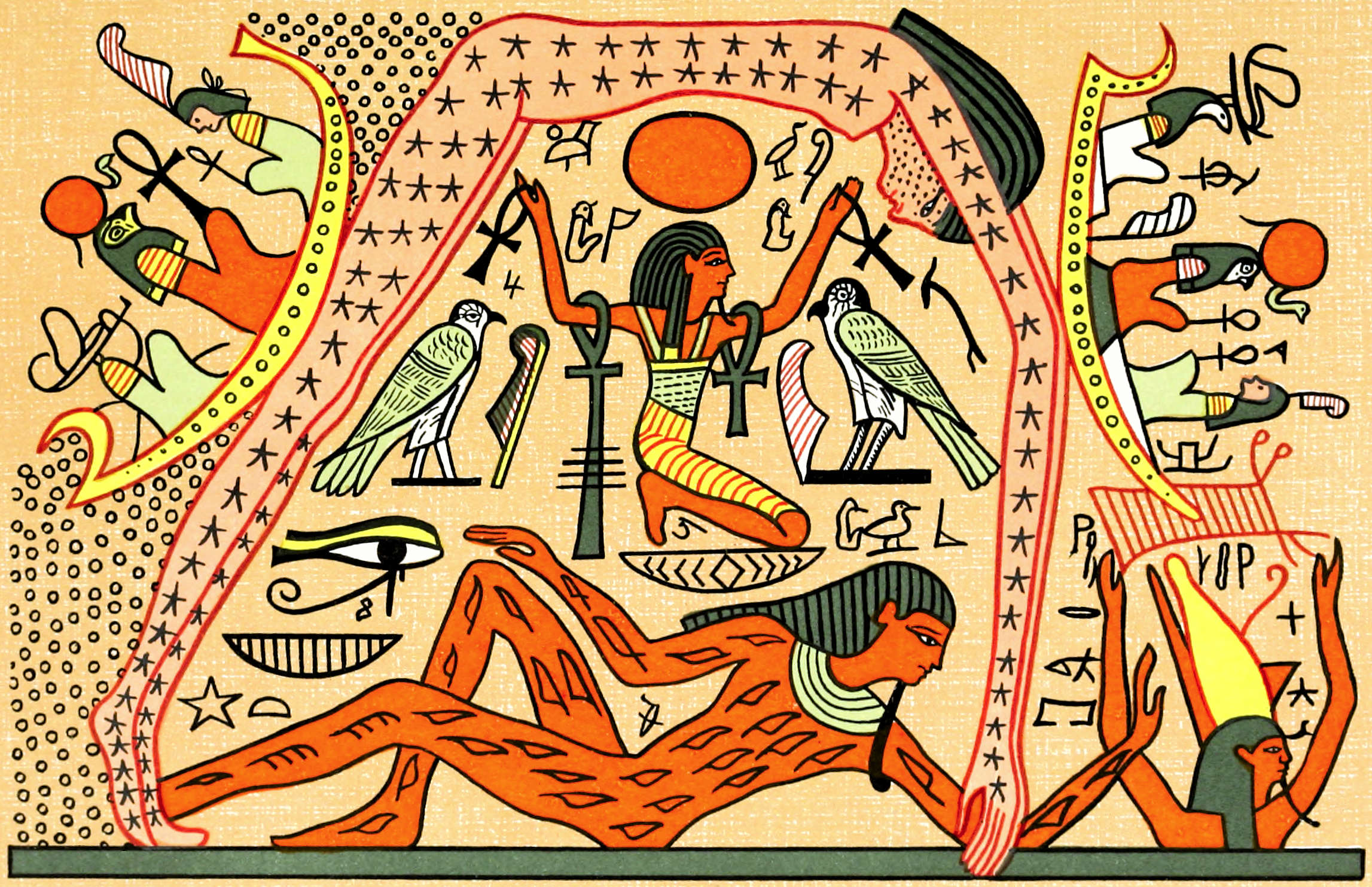
Goddess Nut, supported by the god of the air Shu; the earth god Geb is below them

There are nine different copies of the book and they have various dates. Three copies are found on monuments and six more are found in the papyri of the second century AD found in the temple library in ancient Tebtunis, a town in the southern Faiyum Oasis. These include texts both in hieratic and demotic; some parts are written in hieroglyphs as well.

Three texts of the Book of Nut are preserved on monuments: the tomb of Ramses IV, The Cenotaph of Seti I at the Osireion in Abydos, and the tomb of the noblewoman Mutirdis (TT410) of the 26th Dynasty. These monumental copies are written in hieroglyphs.

Currently, the Tebtunis textual material is scattered all over the world due to its complex excavation and acquisition history. There are several thousand fragments of unpublished papyri held by various museums that are being evaluated by scholars.

The most highly prized of the manuscripts are the demotic Carlsberg papyri 1, and 1a, because of their completeness. They were written by the same scribe. Other manuscripts are mostly fragmentary.

There are substantial differences among all of these copies, indicating that the textual tradition of the Book of Nut was still very much alive even in the second century AD.

== History of scholarship ==
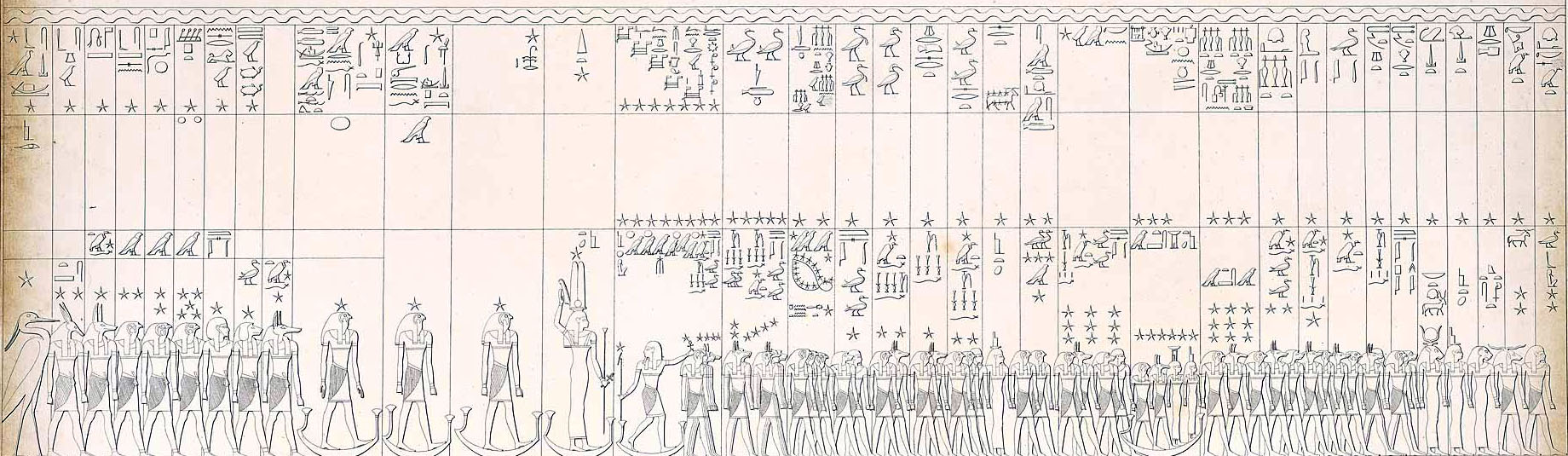
The inscription of Seti I with 36 decans portrayed

The early Egyptologists gave a lot of attention to the astronomical parts of the Book of Nut. First available for modern research was the material from the tomb of Ramses IV, which included the astronomical painting of Nut and the list of the decans. The text was first used by Jean-François Champollion and Ippolito Rosellini, later copied by Heinrich Brugsch. A new edition was issued in 1990 by Erik Hornung.

In 1933, The Cenotaph of Seti I at the Osireion in Abydos was discovered. This was important because this version represents the oldest text.

Adriaan de Buck's translation of the cryptographic sections of the Book of Nut significantly advanced the studies.

In 1977, Jan Assmann published another relevant text from the tomb of the noblewoman Mutirdis, dating to the 26th Dynasty.

Some important new material has been published since 2007.

== Dates of composition ==
Most likely the Book of Nut text evolved over a long period of time going back before the time of Seti I. The astronomical data included in the decan list below the body of Nut point to the 12th Dynasty, the time of Sesostris III.

There are two different decan lists that cannot be reconciled, so one of them must be secondary. According to von Lieven, the Middle Kingdom data is secondary, and she suggests that the earlier list goes back to the Old Kingdom, the first of the three major divisions of dynasties.

== See also ==
- Egyptian calendar

== Notes ==
=== Works cited ===
- Assmann, Jan (1977). Das Grab der Mutirdis (in German). Mainz: von Zabern. ISBN 3-8053-0042-5.
- Clagett, Marshall (1995). Calendars, Clocks, and Astronomy. Ancient Egyptian Science. Vol. 2. Philadelphia: American Philosophical Society. p. 357. ISBN 0-87169-214-7.
- Frankfort, Henri; de Buck, Adriaan; Gunn, Battiscombe (1933). The Cenotaph of Seti I at Abydos. London: Egypt Exploration Society.
- Hornung, Erik (1990). Zwei ramessidische Königsgräber: Ramses IV. und Ramses VII (in German). Mainz: von Zabern. ISBN 3-8053-1067-6.
- von Lieven, Alexandra (2007). Grundriss des Laufes der Sterne: Das sogenannte Nutbuch (in German). Copenhagen: The Carsten Niebuhr Institute of Ancient Eastern Studies, University of Copenhagen. ISBN 978-87-635-0406-5.
- von Lieven, Alexandra (2010). "Translating the Fundamentals of the Course of the Stars". In Imhausen, Annette; Pommerening, Tanja (eds.). Writings of Early Scholars in the Ancient Near East, Egypt, Rome, and Greece: Translating Ancient Scientific Texts. Beiträge zur Altertumskunde. Vol. 286. Walter de Gruyter. ISBN 978-3-11-022993-6.
- Willems, Harco (1996). The world of the coffin texts: Proceedings of the symposium held on the occasion of the 100th birthday of Adriaan de Buck, Leiden December 17 – 19, 1992. Leiden: Nederlands Institut voor het Nabije Oosten. ISBN 90-6258-209-5.
