= Idyll XIV =

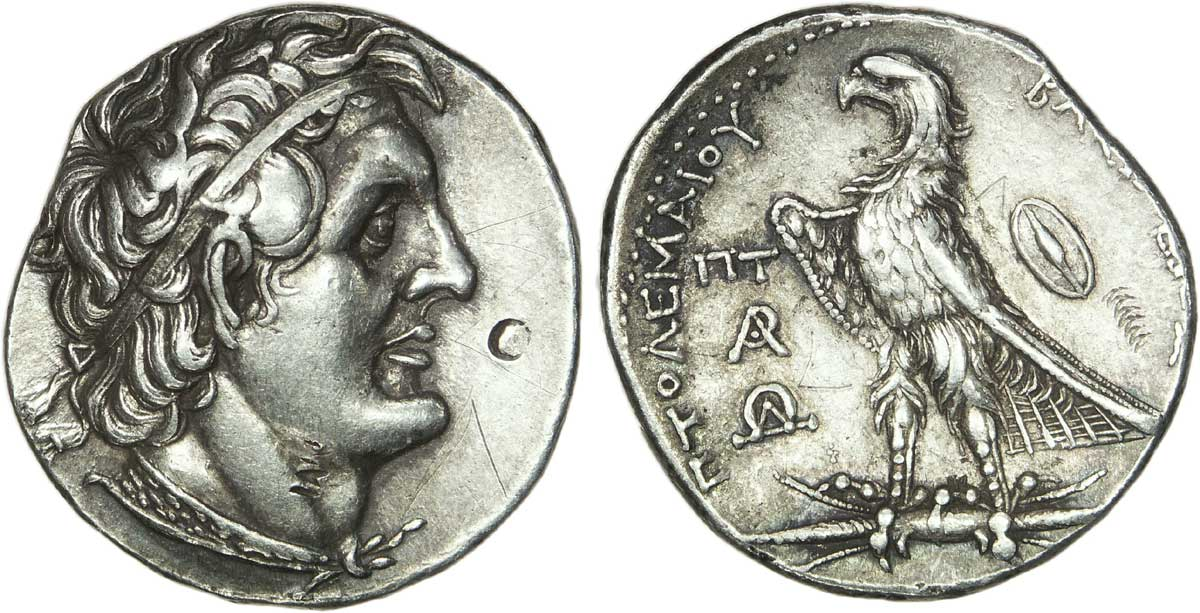
Tetradrachm of Ptolemy II

Idyll XIV, also called Κυνίσκας Ἔρως ('The Love of Cynisca') or Θυώνιχος ('Thyonichus'), is an 'urban mime' by the 3rd century BC Greek poet Theocritus. This Idyll, like the next, is dramatic in form. One Aeschines tells Thyonichus the story of his quarrel with his mistress Cynisca. He speaks of taking foreign military service, and Thyonichus recommends that of Ptolemy.

== Summary ==
'She caught up her robes, and forth she rushed, quicker than she came'

The "Love of Cynisca" is a dialogue of common life. J. M. Edmonds thinks the scene is neither Egypt nor Sicily, perhaps Cos. The characters (Aeschines and Thyonichus), middle-aged men, one of whom has been crossed in love, meet in the road, and in the ensuing conversation the lover tells the story of his quarrel with Cynisca, and ends with expressing his intention of going for a soldier abroad. His friend suggest that he should enlist in the army of Ptolemy, and gives that monarch a flattering testimonial, which, according to Edmonds, "betrays the hand of the rising poet who seeks for recognition at court."

== Date ==
According to Andrew Lang, the idyll was probably written at Alexandria, as a compliment to Ptolemy, and an inducement to Greeks to join his forces. There is nothing, however, to fix the date.

== See also ==
- Eclogue 10

== Sources ==
Attribution:

- Edmonds, J. M., ed. (1919). The Greek Bucolic Poets (3rd ed.). William Heinemann. pp. 165–73.
- Lang, Andrew, ed. (1880). Theocritus, Bion, and Moschus. London: Macmillan and Co. pp. 67–71.
