= Roger S. Bagnall =

American classical scholar (born 1947)

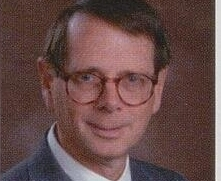
Roger Bagnall in 2013

Roger Shaler Bagnall (born August 19, 1947 in Seattle) is an American classical scholar. He was a professor of classics and history at Columbia University from 1974 until 2007, when he took up the position of first Director of the Institute for the Study of the Ancient World (ISAW) at New York University.

Born in Seattle, Washington, Bagnall studied at Yale University (B.A., 1968) and University of Toronto (M.A., 1969; Ph.D., 1972). He has published several works on the history of Ancient Greece and Ancient Egypt, as well as papyrology. He was elected a Fellow of the American Academy of Arts and Sciences in 2000 and a member of the American Philosophical Society in 2001.

In 2003, he won the Mellon Distinguished Achievement Award from the Andrew W. Mellon Foundation.

== Selected works ==
=== Books ===
- With Raffaella Cribiore (2006) Women's Letters from Ancient Egypt, 300 BC-AD 800. Ann Arbor, MI: University of Michigan Press.

=== Publications ===
- Bagnall, R., Aravecchia N., Cribiore R., Davoli P., McFadden, S., & Kaper, O. E. (2015) An Oasis City, New York: NYU Press.
