= Michel Chauveau =

French academic (born 1956)

Michel Chauveau (French pronunciation: [miʃɛl ʃovo]; born 1956) is a French historian and Egyptologist known for authoring Egypt in the Age of Cleopatra and Cleopatra: Beyond the Myth. Chauveau is Director of Studies at the École pratique des hautes études in Paris.

== Bibliography ==
- "Rive droite, rive gauche. Le nome panopolite au IIeet IIIe siècles de notre ère" in Perspectives on Panopolis. Brill Publishers. 2002.
- Cleopatra: Beyond the Myth. Levi. 1998.
- Egypt in the Age of Cleopatra. Hachette Books. 1997.
- Contr. Demotic Texts from the Collection: Carlsberg Papyri, Vo. 1. 1991.
