= Stationarius (Roman military) =

Guard duty for lower-ranking soldiers

Stationarius (Greek στατιωνάριος, stationarios or στατιονάρικος, stationarikos) was a temporary assignment of guard duty or policing functions for lower-ranking soldiers in military police detachments of the Imperial Roman army. Small detachments of milites stationarii held posts throughout Italy and the provinces where the military presence might otherwise be minimal. They take their name from statio, a general term for "post" or "station". While individual soldiers were typically transitory, the stations themselves seem to have been permanent, and stationarii were often identified by what station they held (for example, "stationarius of the Claudianus road").

Although it has sometimes been assumed that local people would resent a police presence, in fact the evidence suggests they turned to stationarii for protection or intervention in criminal cases, and even at times set up inscriptions in their honor. Stationarii are recorded in a number of varying inscriptions, and are first attested by a collection of ostraka dating 108–117, during the reign of Trajan.

An assignment as stationarius appears to have been "grunt work," and it never appears among an officer's cursus honorum. Either the post was assigned to men of little potential, or it was considered too lacking in distinction to include in a résumé.

Other types of military police were the frumentarii, regionarii, and beneficiarii.

As an adjective, stationarius has other uses that might imply private guards.
