= Joseph Manning (historian) =

American history professor

J. G. Manning
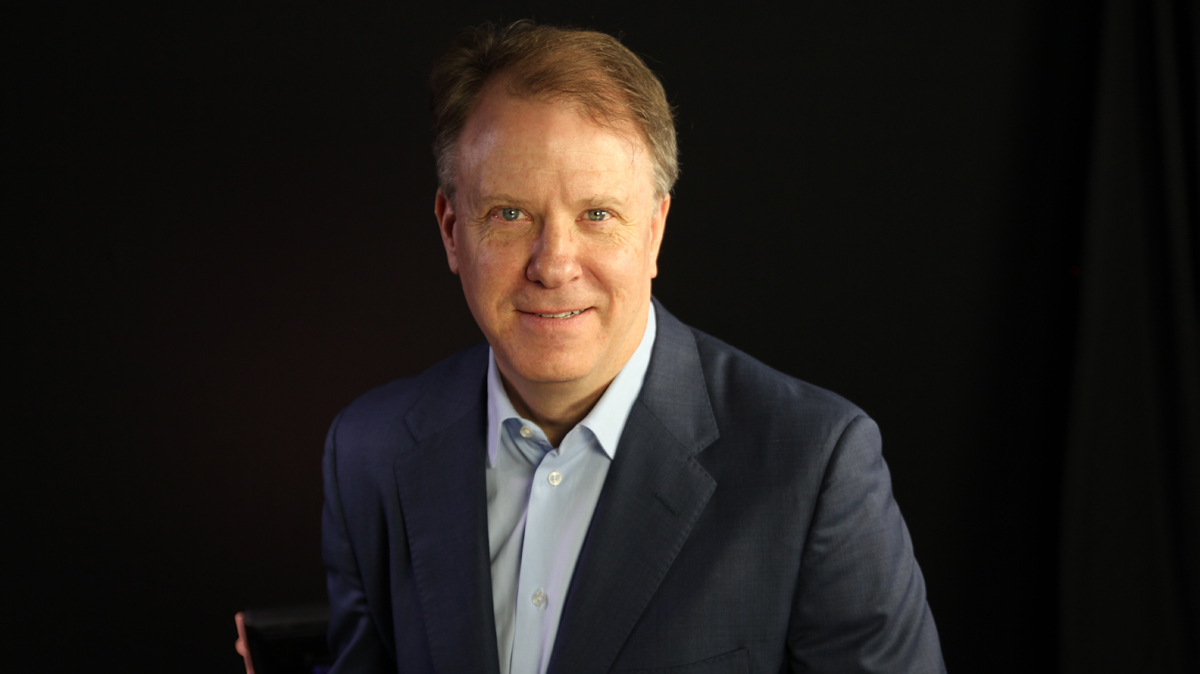
- Manning.
- Born: 1959 (age 66–67); United States
- Education: Benet Academy
- Alma mater: Ohio State University; The University of Chicago
- Occupation: Professor

Joseph Gilbert (J.G.) Manning (born May 1959) is a professor of History at Yale University. Manning holds the William K. and Marilyn M. Simpson Chair in History & in Classics. He is a Senior Research Scholar at Yale Law School, and a Professor (by courtesy) in the School of the Environment at Yale.

Manning is a specialist in the history of the Mediterranean world in the Hellenistic period with particular focus on the legal and economic history of Ptolemaic Egypt. His current work is situated at the intersection of paleoclimatology, the history of institutions, and historical change. He is the Principal Investigator of a major National Science Foundation funded project investigating the link between explosive volcanic eruptions, Nile flood behavior, and human responses to climatic change with very broad implications for understanding climatic change across the pre-industrial world. He is currently at work on a major book examining global history since the Neolithic from the viewpoint of paleoclimatology, environmental history and climatic change.

Before coming to Yale, Manning taught in the Classics Department for two years at Princeton University. Manning went on to the Classics Department at Stanford University and taught there for 12 years. He was a Solmsen Fellow at the Institute for Research in the Humanities at the University of Wisconsin-Madison in 1995–1996. He is a collaborative member of Yale's Program in Economic History, and was a founder of the comparative premodern history group at Yale, Archaia.

== Education ==
Manning grew up in Western Springs, Illinois, a western suburb of Chicago. He attended high school at Benet Academy, a Catholic prep school in Lisle, Illinois. He received his B.A. from Ohio State University (1981) in the History of Art with a specialization in Medieval architectural history, and History, and his M.A. (1985) and Ph.D. (1992) from the University of Chicago in Egyptology, specializing in Demotic (Egyptian) language and texts.

== Fellowships ==
- Fellow, The American Research Center in Egypt, Cairo, 1989–1990
- Solmsen fellowship, Institute for Research in the Humanities, The University of Wisconsin-Madison, 1995–1996
- Stanford Humanities Center, 1998–1999
- William C. Bark National Fellowship, Hoover Institution, Stanford University, 2000–2001
- Whitney Humanities Center Fellow, Yale University 2012–2014
- Guggenheim Fellowship, 2019–2020
- Getty Scholar, Getty Research Institute, 2020

== Selected publications ==
- The Hauswaldt Papyri. A Family Archive from Edfu in the Ptolemaic Period. Demotische Studien, Vol. 12. Würzburg, 1997
- Land and power in Ptolemaic Egypt. The structure of land tenure 332–30 BCE. Cambridge University Press, 2003
- The last pharaohs. Egypt under the Ptolemies, 305–30 BC. Princeton University Press, 2009.
- Law and legal practice in Egypt from Alexander to the Arab Conquest. A selection of papyrological sources in translation with introductions and commentary. Edited with J.G. Keenan & Uri Yiftach-Firanko. Cambridge University Press, 2014.
- The Open Sea. The Economic Life of the Ancient Mediterranean World from the Iron Age to the Rise of Rome. Princeton University Press, 2018.
- Manning, J. G., Francis Ludlow, Alexander R. Stine, William R. Boos, Michael Sigl and Jennifer R. Marlon. "Volcanic suppression of Nile summer flooding triggers revolt and constrains interstate conflict in ancient Egypt", Nature Communications 8 (2017). doi:10.1038/s41467-017-00957-y
- Joseph G. Manning, The Edinburgh History of the Greeks, 323 to 30 BC: The Hellenistic World, Edinburgh University, Edinburgh,
