= Ptolemaic army =

Army of the Ptolemaic Kingdom

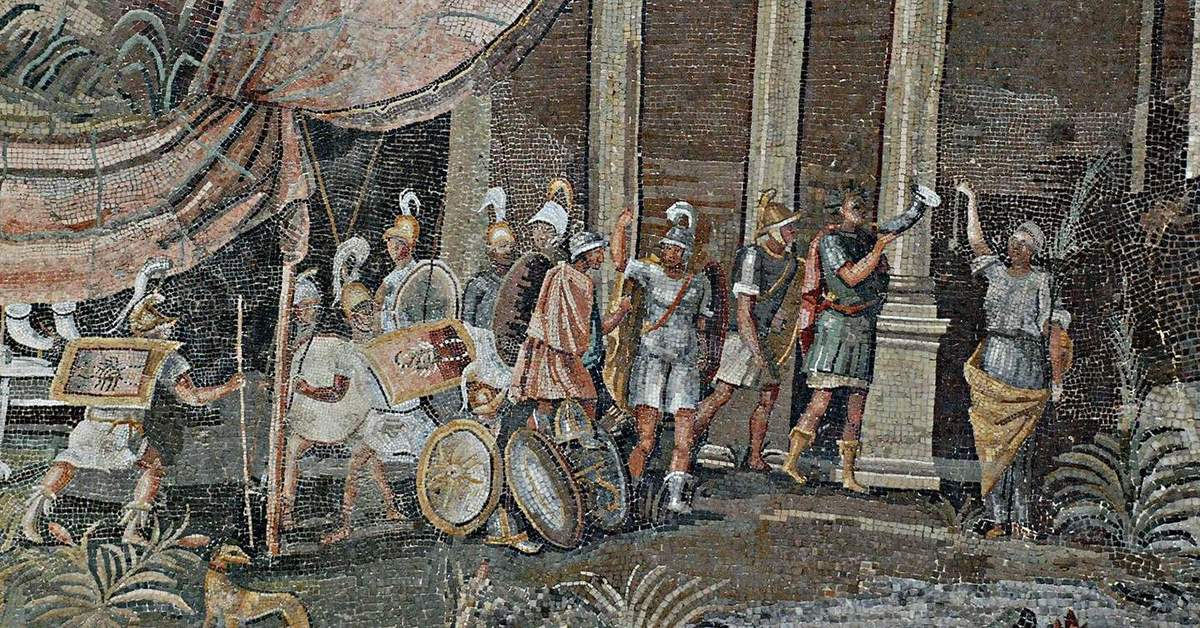
Hellenistic soldiers circa 100 BCE, Ptolemaic Kingdom, Egypt; detail of the Nile mosaic of Palestrina.

The Ptolemaic army was the army of the Ptolemaic Greek kings that ruled Egypt from 305 to 30 BC. Like most of the other armies of the Diadochi, it was very much Macedonian in style, with the use of the long pike (sarissa) in a deep phalanx formation. Despite the strength of the Ptolemaic army, evinced in 217 BC with the victory over the Seleucids at the Battle of Raphia, the Ptolemaic Kingdom itself fell into decline and by the time of Julius Caesar, it was but a mere client kingdom of the Roman Republic. The army by the time of Caesar's campaigns in the eastern Mediterranean was a mere shadow of its former self: generally, a highly disorganized assemblage of mercenaries and other foreign troops.

Ptolemy I was a general in the army of Alexander the Great and after Alexander's death had taken over the province of Egypt as a satrap (local governor). Along with the other successors to Alexander he did not hold the title of king until 305, but was still an important player in the affairs of the Macedonian Empire in the east. In 312 BC at Gaza, Ptolemy, who was assisting the fugitive satrap of Babylonia, Seleucus I, came up against the forces of Antigonus I who was seen as a major threat to the stability of the empire due to his strength and power. Ptolemy had a force of 18,000 infantry and 4,000 cavalry, these being a mixture of Macedonians, mercenaries, and native Egyptians.

Ptolemy I granted his soldiers land to order to strengthen their loyalty. The granting of land also allowed for soldiers to easily mobilize when needed in times of war. This concluded to the distribution of soldiers throughout the countryside alongside the founding of a single Greek polis in Egypt, Ptolemais. The Ptolemies also created a cleruchy system in order to collect revenue from these plots of land. The addition of the cleruchy system allowed for "the diversification of the location of military settlements, a decrease and leveling of the size of soldiers' plots and expansion of the system to a larger pool of locally recruited individuals."

== Major battles ==
- Battle of Gaza (312 BC)
- Battle of Salamis (306 BC)
- Battle of Cos
- Battle of Raphia
- Battle of Panium
- Battle of the Oenoparus
- Siege of Alexandria (47 BC)
- Battle of the Nile (47 BC)
- Battle of Actium

== See also ==
- Phylakitai, police of Ptolemaic Egypt
- Hellenistic armies
- Ptolemaic navy
- Seleucid army
