= Bryn Mawr Classical Review =

Open-access journal reviewing academic literature

- Discipline: Classics
- Language: English

Publication details
- History: November 1990 to present
- Publisher: Bryn Mawr College/University of Pennsylvania (US)

Standard abbreviations
- ISO 4: Bryn Mawr Class. Rev.

Indexing
- ISSN: 1055-7660
- ISSN: 1063-2948

Links
- Journal homepage

Bryn Mawr Classical Review (BMCR) was founded in 1990. It covers book reviews in the field of classical studies, including classical archaeology. WorldCat lists this electronic publication as an open-access journal.
