= Tebtunis =

Archaeological site in the Egyptian depression of el-Faiyum

Coordinates: 29°06′26″N 30°45′40″E

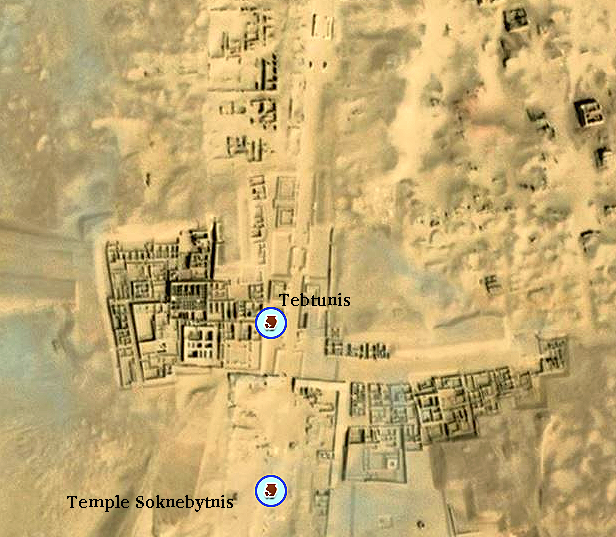
Tebtunis and Soknebtynis temple-Fajyum gouvernorát

Tebtunis was a city and later town in Lower Egypt. The settlement was founded in approximately 1800 BC by the Twelfth Dynasty king Amenemhat III. It was located at what is now Tell Umm el-Baragat in the Faiyum Governorate. In Tebtunis there were many Greek and Roman buildings. It was a rich town and was a very important regional center during the Ptolemaic period.

It is possible that Tebtunis was identical with a town called Theodosiopolis (from Koine Greek: Θεοδοσιούπολις Theodosioúpolis), which is only attested since late antiquity.

In Coptic, it became Toutōn (Arabic: Tuṯun). In the Middle Ages, Toutōn was a major centre of Coptic manuscript copying. At least thirteen existing manuscripts were copied there between AD 861 and 940. The present village of Tuṯun is located about 2.5 miles (4.0 km) northeast of Umm el-Baragat.

== Tebtunis papyri ==
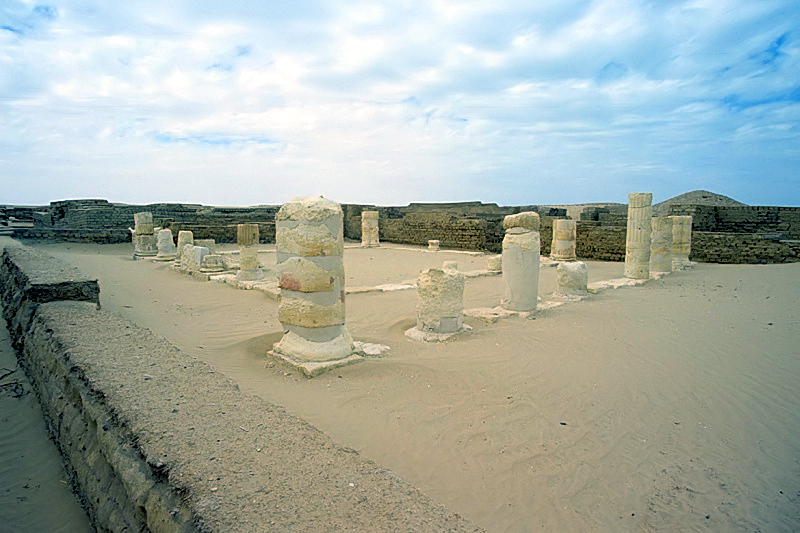
Temple of Sobek in Tebtunis, el-Fayyum, Egypt

Tebtunis flourished during the Ptolemaic Kingdom and is famous for the many papyri in Demotic and Greek found there. These papyri give information about how people in Tebtunis lived from day to day. For example, one papyrus was found that gave 'minutes' of a meeting of a group of priests. On this papyrus were the names of the priests, what the meeting was about, and a date – indicating that it was written during the Ptolemaic period.

On the basis of documentary papyri, it is possible to gain interesting insights into the life of the priests of local main god, Soknebtunis. For instance, a key text for understanding a major land reform in Egypt at the beginning of Roman rule stems from Tebtunis: The priests of the Soknebtunis temple negotiated with the prefect of Egypt in 24–22 BC that part of the temple's land holdings would be converted into state land. In return, the priests and their descendants were to receive the privilege of leasing a specific portion of this former temple land. These issues were outlined in a petition from 71/72 AD, which the priests of Soknebtunis addressed to the prefect because they were in dispute with a local official over the taxation of these plots. Another group of papyri reveals that in the 120s AD the acting prophet of the Soknebtunis temple (qua office the leader of the rites of the temple) held simultaneously the prophecy of a Sobek sanctuary in the Middle Egyptian town Akoris - a good 100 km away from Tebtunis.

Among the Tebtunis papyri are also preserved many Egyptian astronomical and astrological texts, including several copies of what now is called the Book of Nut, which originally was entitled, "The Fundamentals of the Course of the Stars", and it explicates the concept of sunrise as mythological rebirth.

== Local mythology: Cronus alias Geb ==
A distinctive feature of the local mythology in Greco-Roman times was the equation of the Greek god Cronus with the Egyptian god Geb, which was expressed on the one hand in the local iconography of the gods, in which Geb was depicted as a man with attributes of Cronus or Cronus with attributes of Geb. On the other hand, the priests of the local main temple identified themselves in Egyptian texts as priests of "Soknebtunis-Geb", but in Greek texts as priests of "Soknebtunis-Cronus". Accordingly, Egyptian names formed with the name of the god Geb were just as popular among local villagers as Greek names derived from Cronus, especially the name "Kronion.

== Manuscripts ==
=== Papyri ===
- The Tebtunis papyri vol. I, edited with translations and notes by Bernard P. Grenfell, Arthur S. Hunt and J. Gilbart Smyly, 1902 at the Internet Archive
- The Tebtunis papyri vol. II, edited with translations and notes by Bernard P. Grenfell, Arthur S. Hunt and J. Edgard Goodspeed, 1907 at the Internet Archive
- The Tebtunis papyri vol. III part 1, edited with translations and notes by Arthur S. Hunt and J. Gilbart Smyly, 1933 at the Internet Archive

=== Parchments ===
- University of Michigan, Manuscripts Copied in Touton
