= Tunis, Faiyum Governorate =

Village in Faiyum Governorate, Egypt

Tunis تونس
- Village
- Location in Egypt
- Coordinates: 29°23′50″N 30°29′31″E
- Country: Egypt
- Governorate: Faiyum
- Markaz: Yousef El Seddik
- Time zone: UTC+2 (EET)
  - Summer (DST): UTC+3 (EEST)

Tunis (Egyptian Arabic: تونس) is a modern village in the Faiyum Governorate known for its pottery workshops and small art galleries.

== History ==
The village is new, created in the 1960s by famous Egyptian poet Sayed Hegab as well as writer Abdou Gobeir. In the 1980s, Hegab's wife, Evelyne Porret, a Swiss potter, fell in love with Egypt and the touristic village, and established a pottery school in it that played a large role in preserving Faiyum's ancient Egyptian pottery culture. The pottery school still exists and remains active today.

== Institutions ==
=== Fayoum Art Center ===
Mohamed Abla, an Egyptian artist, founded Fayoum Art Center in 2006. It is a non-profit organization which was inspired by the International Summer Academy in Salzburg. The Center is dedicated to all the artists around the world. It helps artists by giving them studio spaces they need, besides providing them with art libraries and living areas. Additionally, the first Caricature Museum in the Middle East was built in the center. The museum includes a variety of collection of caricature.

=== Ibis Cooking School and Restaurant ===
Not only is the village limited to the art of pottery, but it also combines the art of pottery with cooking. Ibis Cooking School and Restaurant is located at Mahmoud Youssef Pottery Atelier.

== Events ==
=== Tunis Village Annual Handicrafts Festival ===
The Tunis Village Annual Handicrafts Festival takes place every autumn. It gathers artists and potters from Tunis, Cairo, and around the world. The festival focuses on giving participants the chance to explore the value of potter, exchange knowledge, share their interests and discuss challenges.

== Climate ==
The climate of the village is warm (22-28 degrees Celsius) between the months of October and April. However, the weather can be very warm from May to October.

== Early ecotourism development ==
The Faiyum Oasis is located approximately 90 kilometres southwest of Cairo and is characterized by agricultural landscapes, desert environments, lakes, and archaeological, geological, and natural heritage sites. Despite its proximity to Egypt's capital, Faiyum has historically experienced limited economic development and low levels of tourism-related income for local communities.

In the early 2000s, an ecotourism pilot project was launched in Faiyum Governorate by the North South Consultants Exchange (NSCE). The initiative was funded by the Royal Netherlands Embassy in Cairo and implemented in cooperation with the Tourism Development Authority and local authorities, with additional support from private sector sponsors. The project aimed to explore the potential of ecotourism as a tool for sustainable rural development, employment generation, and heritage conservation.

The project was developed following studies that identified Faiyum's tourism potential as significantly underutilized. At the time, most visitors were day tourists who did not stay overnight or make use of local services, resulting in limited economic benefits for the local population. Contributing factors included weak marketing, limited infrastructure, and insufficient interpretation of cultural and natural sites.

=== Project approach ===
The ecotourism pilot adopted a community-based approach, focusing on capacity building, local entrepreneurship, and small-scale tourism activities rather than mass tourism infrastructure. Its objectives included improving local skills related to tourism services, encouraging the preservation of natural and cultural heritage, and increasing the participation of rural communities in tourism value chains. The initiative emphasized ecotourism principles such as responsible travel, environmental conservation, and respect for local culture.

=== Tunis Village and pottery revival ===
A significant component of the pilot project focused on Tunis Village, a small rural settlement overlooking Lake Qarun. Prior to the project, Tunis Village had limited economic activity and minimal engagement with tourism. Through targeted support under the ecotourism initiative, traditional pottery production was promoted and gradually became a defining feature of the village's tourism identity.

Pottery workshops, demonstrations, and training activities enabled local residents to engage directly with visitors and generate income through artisanal production. Over time, Tunis Village became widely associated with pottery and creative rural tourism and emerged as one of Egypt's most prominent examples of community-based tourism development.

=== Ecotourism activities ===
Beyond Tunis Village, the pilot project supported a range of ecotourism activities across Fayoum Governorate. These included desert hiking and camel trekking, bird watching, rural life experiences, traditional crafts, and guided visits to cultural, archaeological, geological, and paleontological sites. Locations featured in demonstration tours included Lake Qarun, Wadi el-Rayan, and Wadi al-Hitan, a UNESCO World Heritage Site known for its fossilized whale remains.

The project encouraged the use of local guides, locally operated accommodations, and locally produced goods in order to increase economic returns to rural communities. Demonstration tours were documented to assess their social, economic, and environmental impacts and to inform future tourism planning.

=== Impact and legacy ===
Although initially implemented as a pilot initiative, the ecotourism project contributed to long-term changes in how Faiyum and Tunis Village were perceived as tourism destinations. Faiyum gained increased recognition as a suitable location for natural and cultural tourism, while Tunis Village became established as a centre for artisanal pottery and rural creative industries.

Many ongoing tourism activities in Faiyum, including the pottery-focused tourism in Tunis Village and desert and nature-based excursions, are considered to have been influenced by the foundations established during this early ecotourism development phase. The project is frequently cited as an early example of structured ecotourism development in rural Egypt.
