= Biahmu =

Village in Faiym, Egypt

Biahmu بيهمو
- Location in Egypt
- Coordinates: 29.36936°N 30.85605°E
- Country: Egypt
- Governorate: Faiym
- Time zone: UTC+2 (EET)
  - Summer (DST): UTC+3 (EEST)

Biahmu (Byahmu) is a village and archaeological site in Faiyum Governorate, Egypt. The town is in the Faiyum Oasis, 7 kilometres (4.3 mi) from the city of Faiyum. Outside the village are the Pedestals of Biahmu, ancients ruins of two colossi built by Amenemhat III.

In 2006, the total population of Biahmu was 17,486 people.

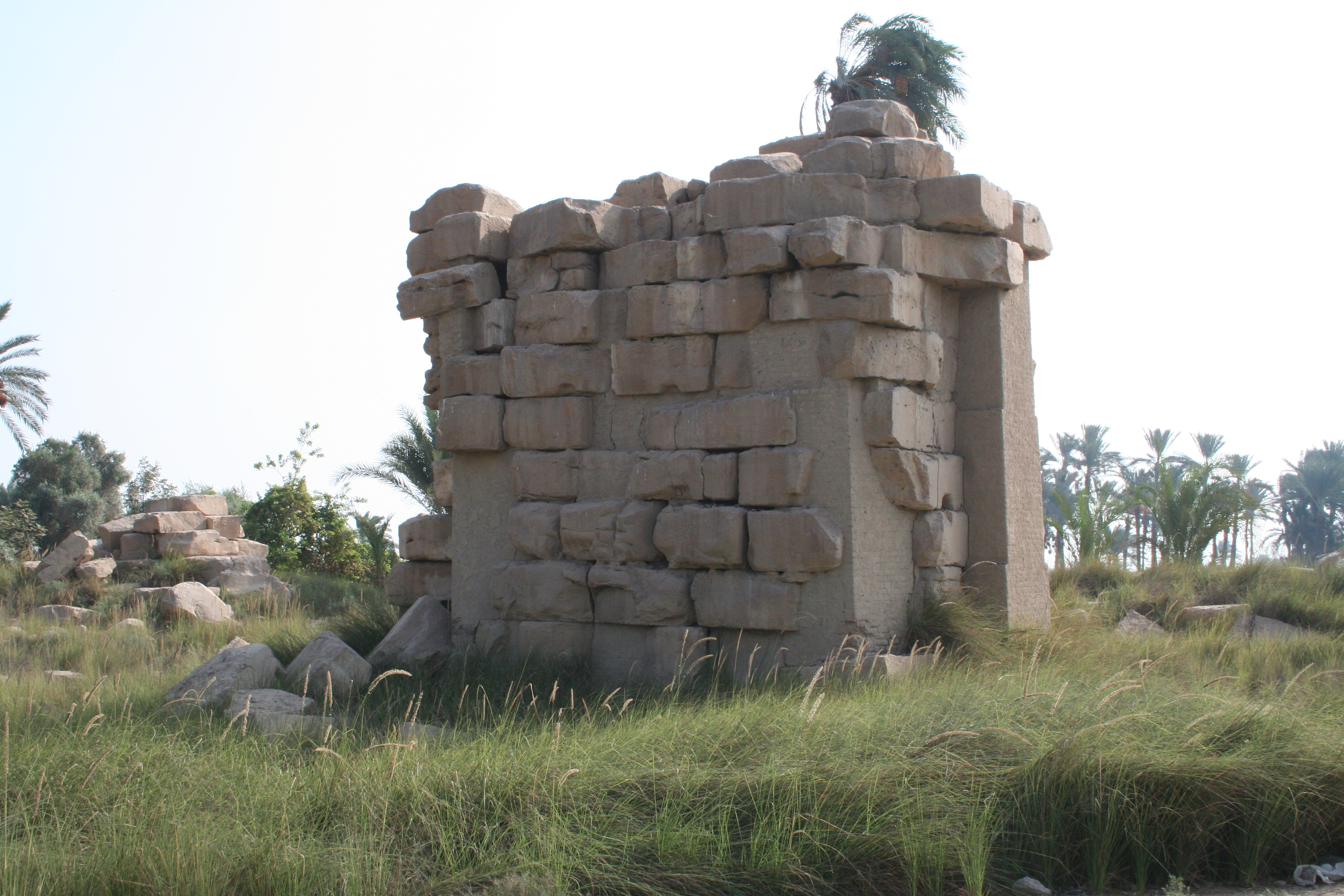
Pedestals of Biahmu
