= Soknopaiou Nesos =

Archaeological site in the Egyptian depression of el-Faiyum

- Dimeh es-Seba
- Dime, Dimeh, Dimai
- Location within Egypt
- 29°32′05″N 30°40′08″E
- Type: Settlement
- Periods: New Kingdom, Ptolemaic, Roman, Coptic
- Location: Egypt
- Region: El-Fayyum

History
- Abandoned: yes

Site notes
- Elevation: 19–30 m (62–98 ft) (AMSL)
- Length: 660 m (2,170 ft)
- Width: 350 m (1,150 ft)
- Area: 23 ha (57 acres)
- Excavation dates: 1931-32, University of Michigan; 2004-present Soknopaiou Nesos Project (University of Salento)
- Archaeologists: A.E.R.Boak, E.Peterson (1931-32); M.Capasso, P.Davoli (2004-present)
- Management: Supreme Council of Antiquities
- Public access: yes
- Website: http://www.snproject.org

Soknopaiou Nesos (Ancient Greek: Σοκνοπαίου Νῆσος) was an ancient settlement in the Faiyum Oasis (Egypt), located a few kilometers north of Lake Qarun (known in antiquity as Lake Moeris).

The settlement - known nowadays as Dimeh es-Seba (Arabic: ديمة السباع), possibly meaning "Dimeh of the lions" - was an important religious center with an imposing temple dedicated to the god Soknopaios, an oracular god in shape of a crocodile with falcon head, from which the toponym of the town itself derived.

According to papyrological evidence Soknopaiou Nesos was founded in the 3rd century BCE, during the land reclamation project of the Faiyum carried out by the first Ptolemies, and was abandoned in mid 3rd century CE. The archaeological evidence instead, releases new data about a late reoccupation of the site, concentrated especially inside the area of the main temple of the town, during the 4th-5th centuries until the end of the Byzantine period.

== Name ==
Soknopaiou Nesos means "The island of Soknopaios", a contraction of the longer Egyptian name tȝ mȝy Sbk nb Pay pȝ nṯr ʿȝ, "The Island of Sobek, the lord of Pai, the great god". Soknopaios is the local Hellenistic variant of Sobek, the main god of the Faiyum region.

== Description of the site ==
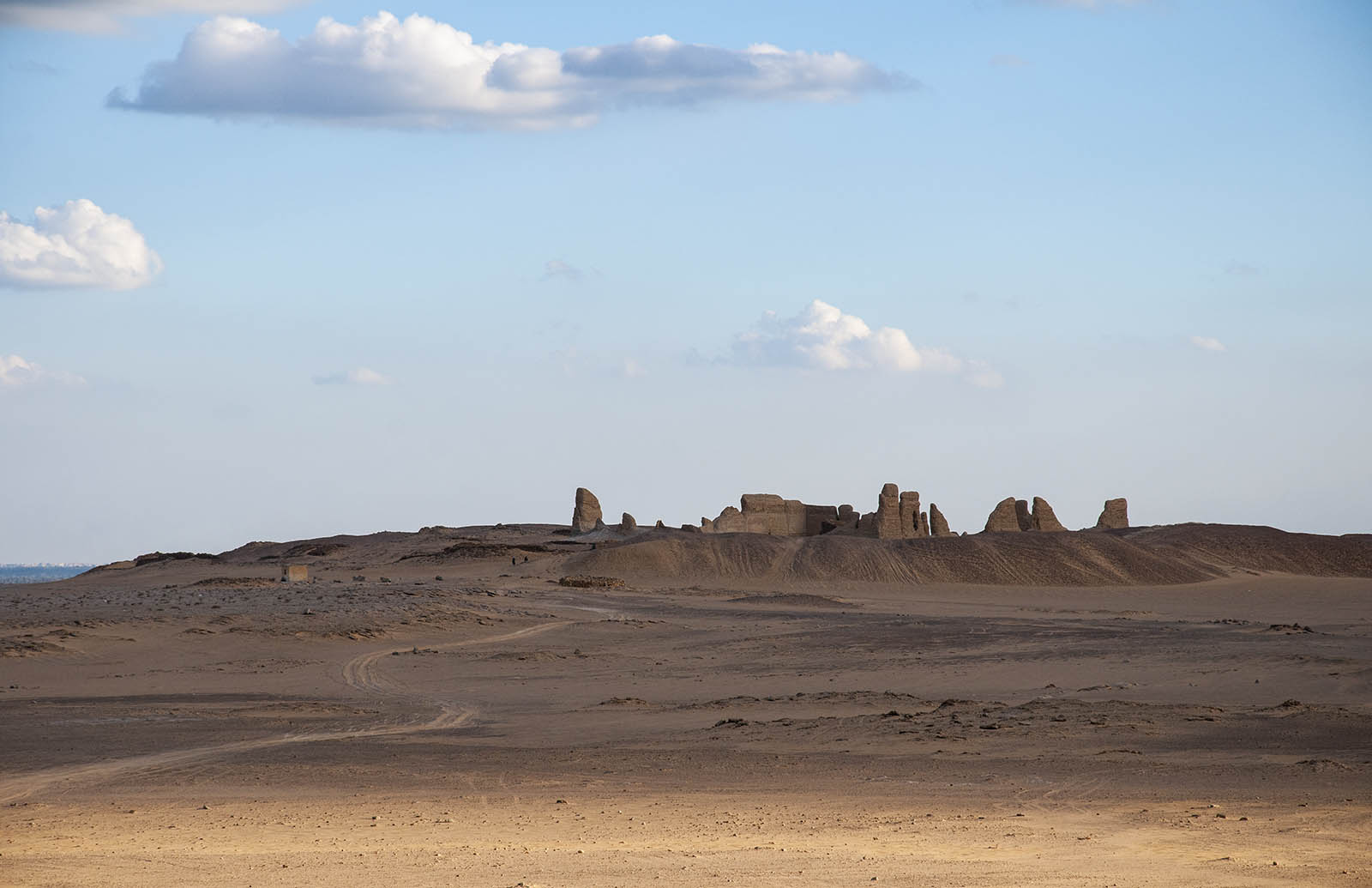
View of the site from North West

The archaeological area of the settlement (kom) has an oval shape measuring 660 m N-S and 350 m E-W and it is crossed by a paved dromos 400 m long. The main archaeological evidence is the monumental light-grey mud-brick temenos to the North-West, with walls preserved in some points up to 15 m in height, having an irregular rectangular plan. Inside this enclosure several buildings are still recognizable, mainly built in mud bricks as well as in stone masonry.

=== The temenos and the main temple ===
The most important building is the main temple, located in the middle of the temenos, which hosted beside Soknopaios the synnaoi theoi, like Isis Nepherses and Soknopiais. The temple is formed by two, contiguous sanctuaries built on the same North-South axis, aligned with the dromos. The two buildings formed one temple in the Roman period and were connected by an open-air courtyard. The former, to the South, is pretty well preserved and is built with brown limestone irregular stones and mud bricks; it has been interpreted as the earliest temple built at the beginning of the Hellenistic period. The latter, to the North, was badly dismantled since the end of Byzantine period and is preserved for only 1.60 m in height. It is built in regular yellow limestone blocks and is thought to be a late Ptolemaic or early Roman addition and became the sanctuary for the worship of the gods, while the building to the South became a sort of propylon. The North temple was restored probably in the first half of the 2nd century CE. A monumental contra-temple was built against its rear wall during the 1st century CE and then remodeled in the 2nd century. A remarkable, stone architectural model of the contra-temple in scale 1:20 was found inside it. Within the temenos area are several mud-brick structures: priests' houses, workshops, administrative buildings, small temples and chapels. Outside of the temenos, to the North, East and West of it, several buildings in mud brick and rough local stones are still visible.

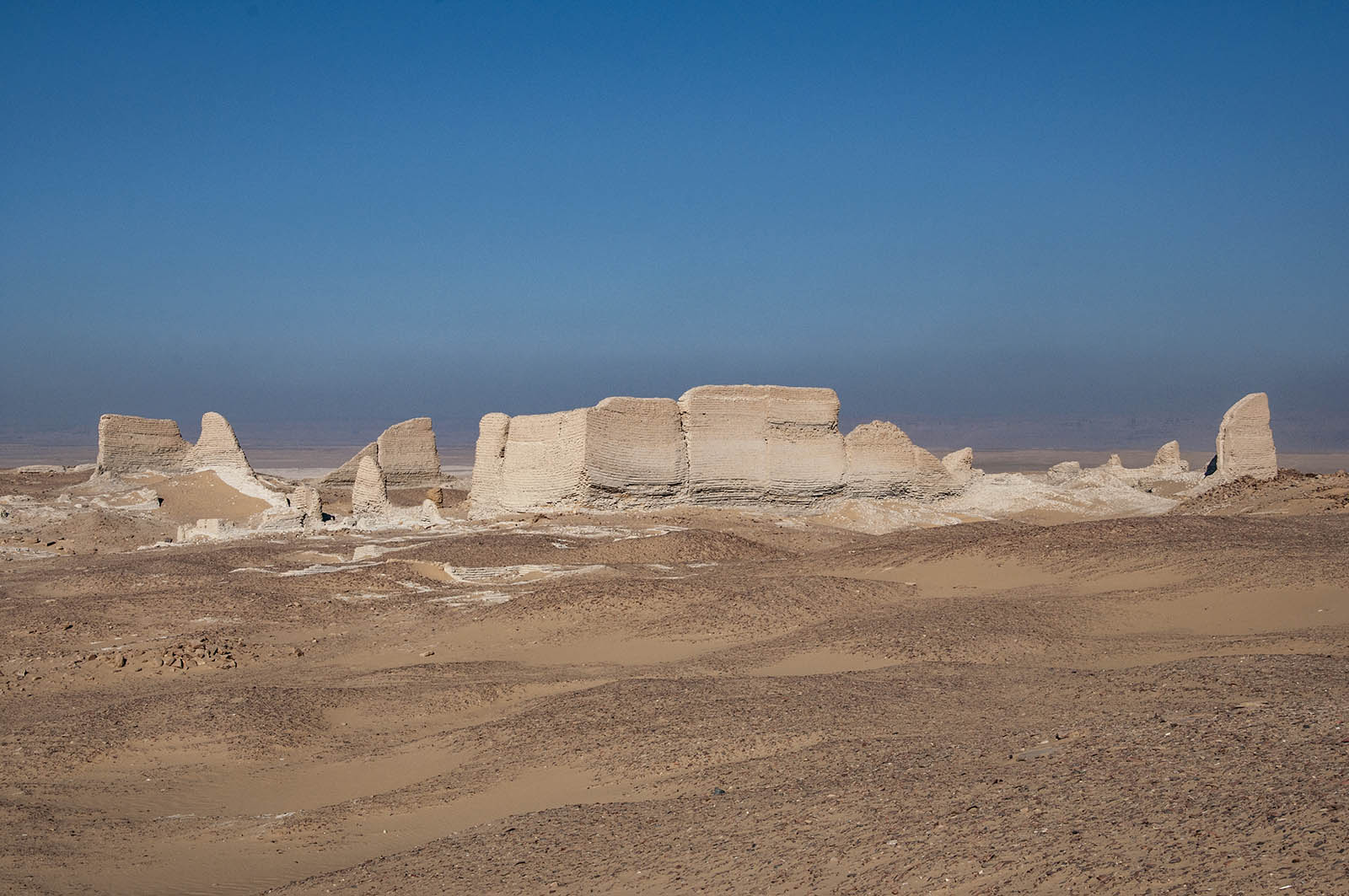
The temenos walls from South East

=== The town and the dromos ===
A monumental evidence in the settlement is a paved dromos, 6–7 m wide and preserved for 329 m, built on a platform 3 meters high. It was intended as a processional road, connecting the temple's southern entrance with a staircase, and dividing the settlement into an eastern and western quarter. Statues of lions and possibly two kiosks were erected on it. Some stairs and two tunnels allowed people to pass from East to West quarter of this imposing barrier that formed a tremendous stage for the ritual processions during more than 150 days of feasts a year. It is the result of different building phases, being extended toward South as far as the settlement expanded in the Roman period.

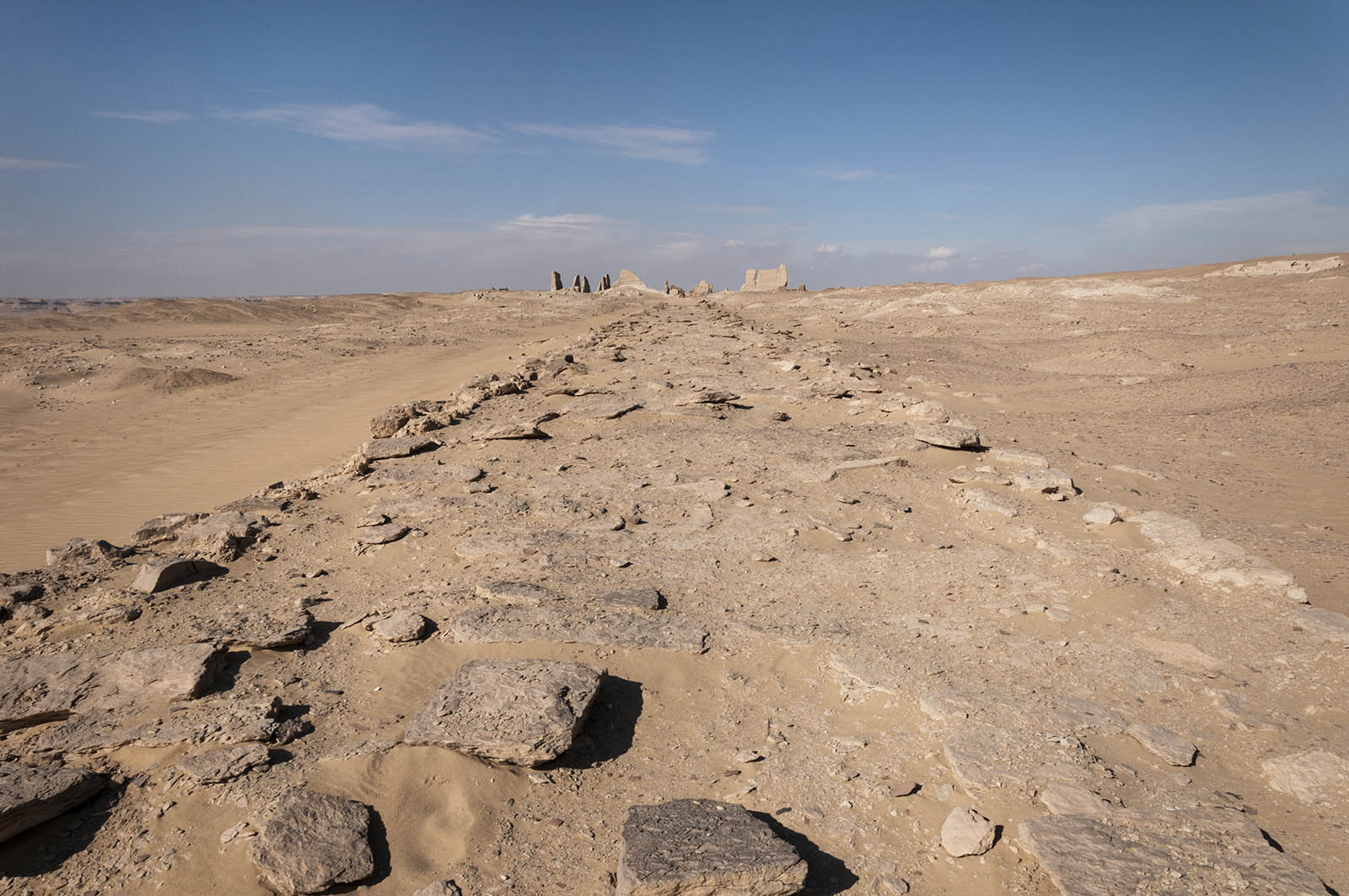
The paved dromos looking North

== Archaeological investigation ==
The site of Soknopaiou Nesos was known already at the beginning of the 19th century, when it has been visited by G.B. Belzoni (1819). Few years later, J.G. Wilkinson visited the site and provided the first topographical plan of the settlement ever drawn. In 1843 K.R. Lepsius, during his Prussian campaign in Egypt, spent two days in Dime, executing a plan of the site as well as some excellent and very well detailed drawings. From the second half of the 19th century Soknopaiou Nesos has been subject of many excavations carried out either by official missions or, what is the most common case, by robbers looking for antiquities to sell at the art market. The site became famous at the end of the 19th century for the great number and well preserved papyri from Ptolemaic to Roman periods.

=== 1890 ===
The first excavations attested are those of Ali Farag, a dealer from Giza, who discovered in 1890 a great number of papyri as well as twenty statues. Many of these papyri entered the main European museums' collections. In 1892 Major R.H. Brown, trying to define the ancient level of Lake Qarun, dug a trench next to the dromos with the aim of reaching its bottom. Therefore, he was convinced that the dromos was a quay and that Dime was originally located on the shore of Lake Qarun.

=== 1900-01 ===
B.P Grenfell and A.S. Hunt carried out an excavation campaign for the EEF looking for papyri and cartonnages. They discovered the necropoleis that stretches from North to South towards West of the settlement and testified to the absence of the lake near the dromos.

=== 1909-10 ===
An archaeological mission organized by the Berlin Königlichen Museen, directed by F. Zucker in collaboration with W. Schubart, carried out excavations at Soknopaiou Nesos. The German scholars dug in several places of the site with the only aim of finding papyri.

=== 1914 ===
Ahmed Kamal Bey carried out a two weeks excavation in the temple on behalf of an Asyut antiquities dealer.

=== 1925-26 ===
G. Caton-Thompson and E.W. Gardner carried out geo-archaeological studies in the area around Dime, aiming to study the ancient Qarun lake's level as well as the agricultural landscape of the Hellenistic and Roman periods. They also investigated the southern edge of the dromos, demonstrating quite convincingly that this road was not used in ancient times as a quay but as a normal alley connecting the two extremities of the town.

=== 1931-32: The University of Michigan excavations ===
In a three-months season, the University of Michigan carried out the first excavation executed in Dime with a scientific method, under the direction of A.E.R. Boak and E.E. Peterson. The research was focused on two areas of the settlement, to the East and to the West of the dromos, excavating well preserved mud-brick buildings and identifying three main occupation phases from the 3rd century BCE to the mid 3rd century C.E. The results of these excavations suggest that at the moment of the foundation of the settlement the houses followed an orthogonal plan oriented on the dromos. This orientation was maintained in the following phases during which the settlement expanded considerably. The University of Michigan team was based for about ten years (1924-1934) in Kom Aushim/Karanis where they carried out extensive excavation seasons. The materials found were divided, according to the law, between Cairo Egyptian Museum and the University of Michigan (at present in the Kelsey Museum of Archaeology, Ann Arbor) .

=== The Soknopaiou Nesos Project ===
Since 2004 the Soknopaiou Nesos Project of the University of Salento (Centro di Studi Papirologici) has been working in Soknopaiou Nesos under the direction of M.Capasso and P.Davoli.

Beside the archaeological excavations, mainly carried out inside the temenos, the team surveyed the settlement and the surroundings. Evidence of pre-Ptolemaic buildings were found below the temple, as well as to the North and West of the kom. On the shores of a palaeo-lake several areas with pottery clusters of the 19th and the 26th dynasties have been documented.

=== Recent discoveries ===
In April 2026, archaeological and conservation efforts led by Paola Davoli of the University of Salento, provided new structural and historical data on this significant Roman-period settlement. Excavation has identified three primary structures within the enclosure as a well-preserved Ptolemaic sanctuary standing over 10 meters high, the remains of a Roman-period temple that was partially dismantled in antiquity, and a structure associated with the worship of Isis.

== The priests of Soknopaiou Nesos ==
The temple of Soknopaios counted well over one hundred priests in Roman times, and thus considerably more personnel than the temples of other settlements on the edge of the Fayyum, such as Bakchias or Tebtunis. The number of priests is also remarkable considering that Soknopaiou Nesos is estimated to have had hardly more than 1000 inhabitants in the late second century. Apparently, the site was inhabited mainly by the priests of the temple of Soknopaios and their families. A closer look at the names of the inhabitants substantiates this hypothesis: According to Egyptian tradition, names were usually passed on among family members: For example, children were named after their grandparents. Since Egyptian culture did not know family names, family identity was maintained in this way. At the same time, priestly offices were only accessible on a hereditary basis: Only those who descended from priests on their father's and mother's side were allowed to hold an office in the temple. According to the written sources from Soknopaiou Nesos, the inhabitants often bore specific names (e.g. Panephremmis, Satabous, Tesenouphis), which were not at all common in other settlements of the Fayyum. Accordingly, the priests of the temple of Soknopaios probably intermarried mainly among themselves, but rarely with priests from other temples.

Due to the specific population structure (which consisted mostly of priestly families), but also due to the remote location of the site (on a plateau on the edge of the desert, which was distant from arable land even in ancient times), the inhabitants of Soknopaiou Nesos lived primarily from trade and animal husbandry, but also from the expenses and donations of visitors who came to the site for religious or tourist interest: Priests were involved in the local camel breeding and caravan trade, while they provided oracles and produced magical amulets in the temple district. Several private archives give a deeper insight into the lives of individual priests and their families, e.g. the archive of Satabus son of the Herieus the Younger, and the archive of Aurelios Pakysis son of Tesenuphis.

In 230 AD, Soknopaiou Nesos went silent: the settlement, and its temple, were abandoned. The reasons for this are not completely clear. According to one hypothesis, a deterioration in the supply situation may have caused the inhabitants to flee. According to another theory, the festive spectacles of the Soknopaios cult lost their attraction for pilgrims and tourists, so that it was no longer worthwhile for the priestly families to maintain the cult at this already disadvantageously situated location.

== See also ==
- List of ancient Egyptian sites
- Urban planning in ancient Egypt
