= Faiyum Oasis =

Desert basin west of the Nile and south of Cairo, Egypt

Coordinates: 29°27′13″N 30°34′51″E

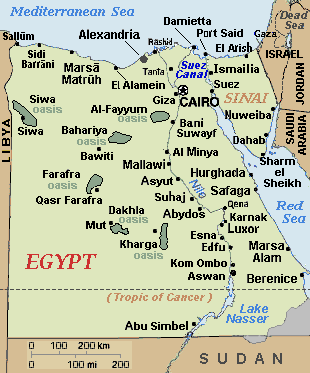
Site of Faiyum Oasis (directly southwest of Cairo, listed as Al-Fayyum) on a map of Egypt

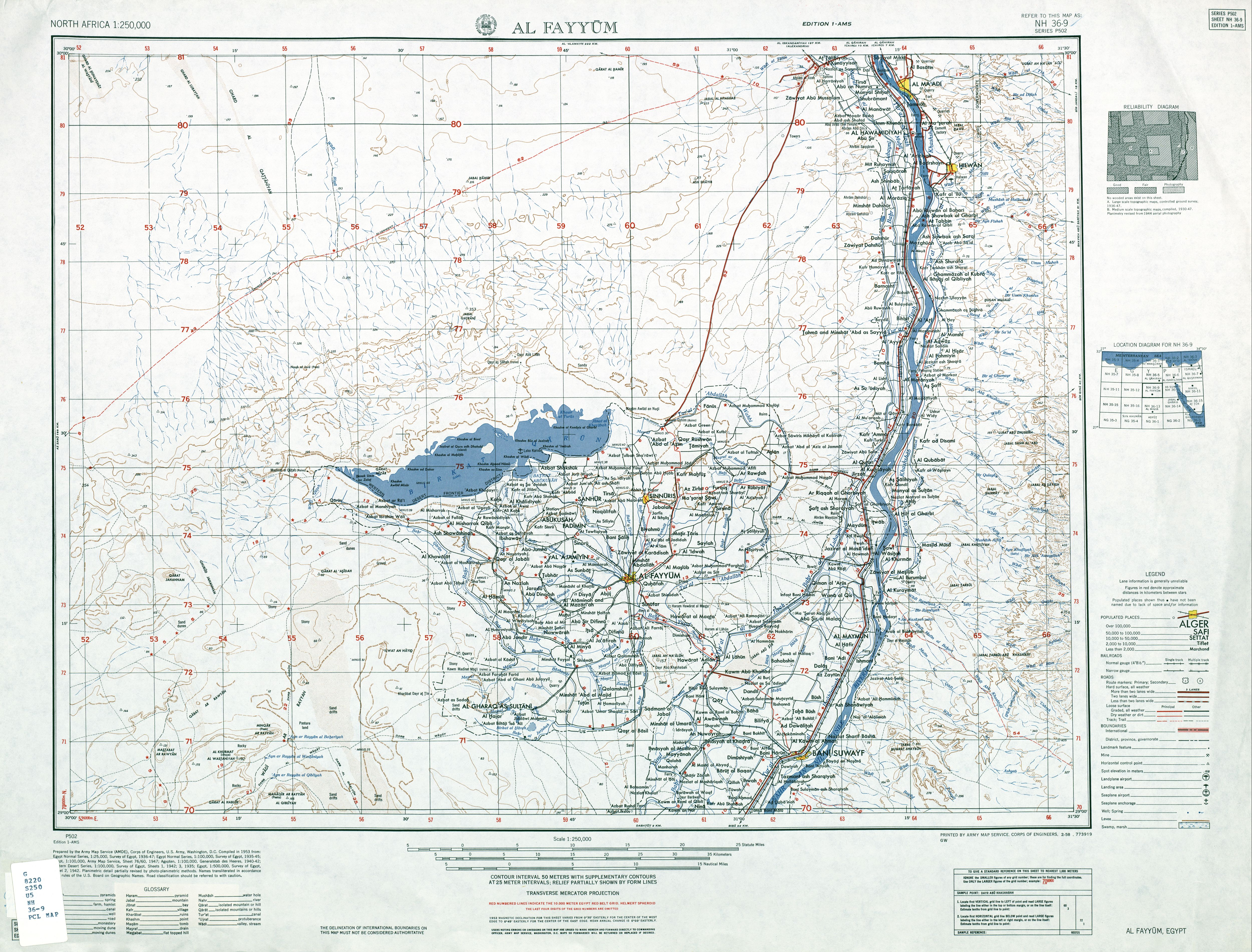
Map showing Faiyum Oasis

The Faiyum Oasis (Arabic: واحة الفيوم Wāḥat al-Fayyum) is a depression or basin in the desert immediately west of the Nile, 62 miles south of Cairo, Egypt. The extent of the basin area is estimated at between 1,270 km^{2} (490 mi^{2}) and 1,700 km^{2} (656 mi^{2}). The basin floor comprises fields watered by a channel of the Nile, the Bahr Yussef, as it drains into a desert hollow to the west of the Nile Valley. The Bahr Yussef veers west through a narrow neck of land north of Ihnasya, between the archaeological sites of El Lahun and Gurob near Hawara; it then branches out, providing agricultural land in the Faiyum basin, draining into the large saltwater Lake Moeris (Birket Qarun). In prehistory it was a freshwater lake, but is today a saltwater lake. It is a source of tilapia and other fish for the local area.

Differing from typical oases, whose fertility depends on water obtained from springs, the cultivated land in the Faiyum is formed of Nile mud brought by the Bahr Yussef canal, 24 km (15 miles) in length. Between the beginning of the Bahr Yussef at El Lahun to its end at the city of Faiyum, several canals branch off to irrigate the Faiyum Governorate. The drainage water flows into Lake Moeris.

== History ==
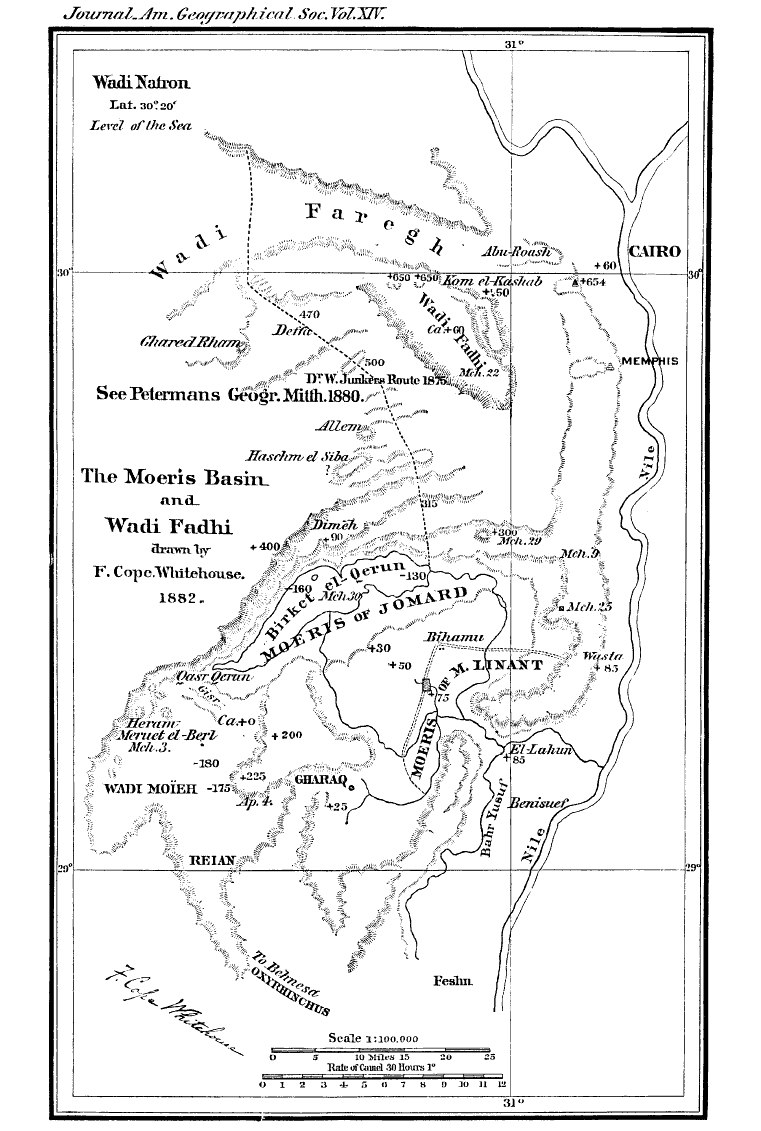
Survey of the Moeris Basin from the late 19th century

When the Mediterranean Sea was a hot, dry hollow near the end of the Messinian Salinity Crisis in the late Miocene, Faiyum was also a dry hollow, and the Nile flowed past it at the bottom of a canyon, which was 8,000 feet (2,400 m) deep or more where Cairo is today. After the Mediterranean reflooded at the end of the Miocene, the Nile canyon became an arm of the sea reaching inland farther than Aswan. Over geological time, that sea arm gradually filled with silt and became the Nile Valley.

Eventually, the Nile valley bed silted up high enough to let the Nile periodically overflow into the Faiyum Hollow, forming a lake. The lake is first recorded from about 3000 BC, around the time of Menes (Narmer). However, for the most part, it would only be filled with high flood waters. Neolithic settlements bordered the lake, and the town of Crocodilopolis (now Faiyum) grew up on the south side where the higher ground created a ridge.

In 2300 BC, the waterway connecting the Nile River to the natural lake was widened and deepened to make a canal now known as the Bahr Yussef. This canal, which fed into the lake, was meant to serve three purposes: controlling the flooding of the Nile, regulating the water level of the Nile during dry seasons, and serving the surrounding area with irrigation. There is evidence that the pharaohs of the Twelfth Dynasty of Egypt used the natural lake of Faiyum as a reservoir to store surpluses of water for use during the dry periods. The immense waterworks undertaken by the ancient Egyptian pharaohs of the Twelfth Dynasty to transform the lake into a vast water reservoir gave the impression that the lake was an artificial excavation, as classic geographers and travellers reported. The lake was eventually abandoned due to the nearest branch of the Nile dwindling in size from 230 BC.

Faiyum was known to the ancient Egyptians as the twenty-first nome of Upper Egypt, Atef-Pehu ("Northern Sycamore"). Its capital was Sh-d-y-t (usually written "Shedyt"), known to the Greeks as Crocodilopolis, and renamed by Ptolemy II Philadelphus as Arsinoe.

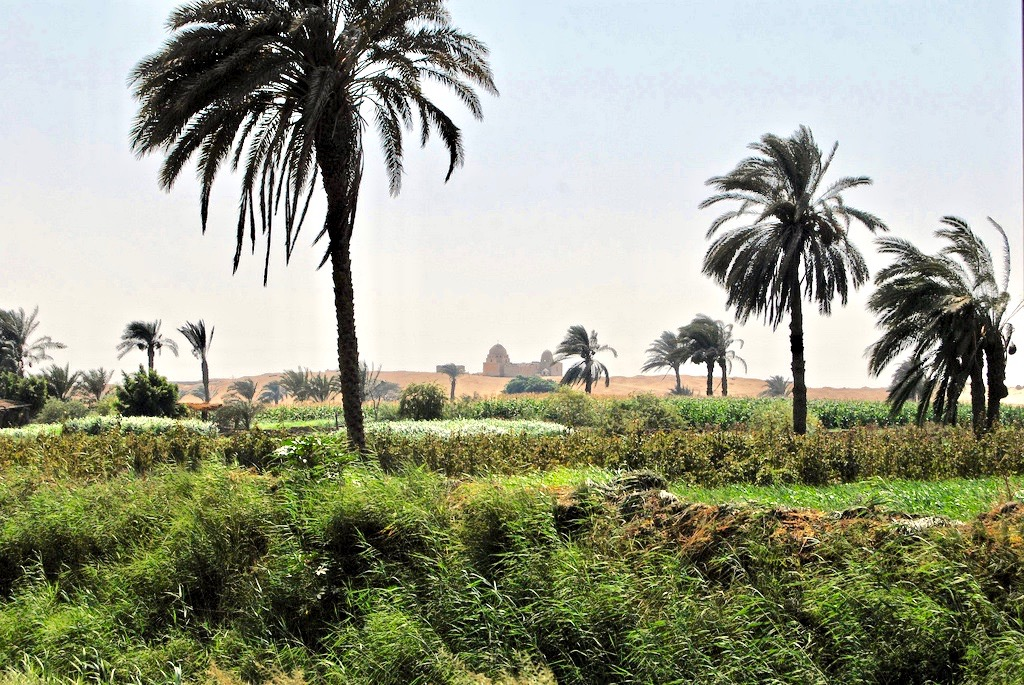
Faiyum Oasis (2008)

This region has the earliest evidence for farming in Egypt, and was a center of royal pyramid and tomb-building in the Twelfth Dynasty of the Middle Kingdom, and again during the rule of the Ptolemaic Kingdom. Faiyum became one of the breadbaskets of the Roman world.

For the first three centuries AD, the people of Faiyum and elsewhere in Roman Egypt not only embalmed their dead but also placed a portrait of the deceased over the face of the mummy wrappings, shroud or case. The Egyptians continued their practice of burying their dead, despite the Roman preference for cremation. Preserved by the dry desert environment, these Fayum mummy portraits make up the richest body of portraiture to have survived from antiquity. They provide a window into a society of peoples of mixed origins—Egyptians, Greeks, Romans, Syrians, Libyans and others—that flourished 2000 years ago in the Faiyum. The Faiyum portraits were painted on wood in a pigmented wax technique called encaustic painting.

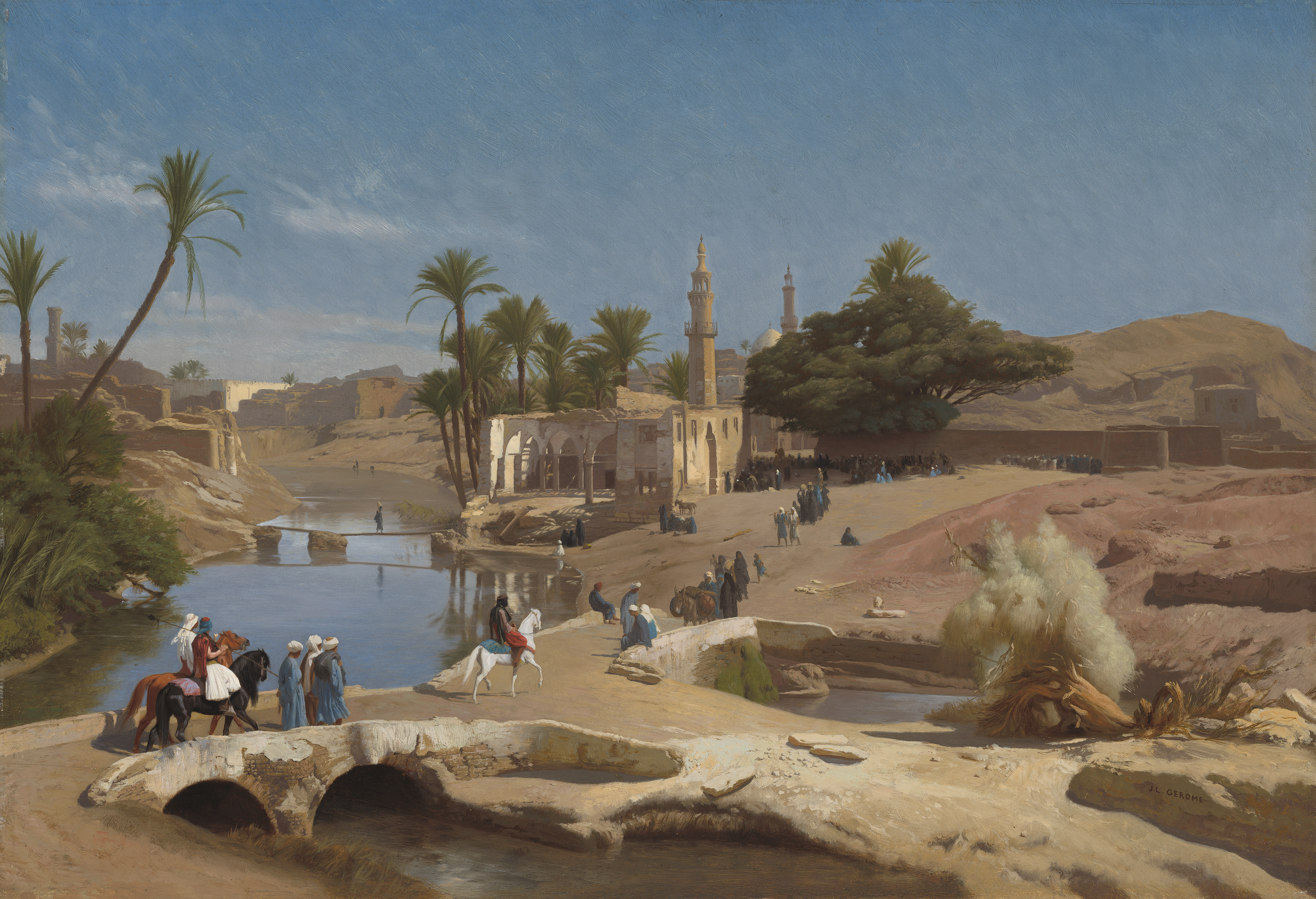
Jean-Léon Gérôme, View of Medinet El-Fayoum, c. 1868–1870

In the late 1st millennium, the arable area shrank. Settlements around the edge of the basin were abandoned. These sites include some of the best-preserved from the late Roman Empire, notably Karanis, and from the Byzantine and early Arab Periods, though recent redevelopment has greatly reduced the archaeological features. In addition to the mummy portraits, the villages of the Faiyum have also proven to be a source of papyrus fragments containing literature and documents in Latin, Greek, and Egyptian scripts.

"Colonial-type" village names (villages named after towns elsewhere in Egypt and places outside Egypt) show that much land was brought into cultivation in the Faiyum in the Greek and Roman periods.

According to the Encyclopædia Britannica Eleventh Edition, in 1910 over 1,000 km^{2} (400 mile^{2}) of the Faiyum Oasis was cultivated, the chief crops being cereals and cotton. The completion of the Aswan Low Dam ensured a supply of water, which enabled 20,000 acres (80 km^{2}) of land, previously unirrigated and untaxed, to be brought under cultivation in the years 1903–1905. Three crops were obtained in twenty months. The province was noted for its figs, grapes, and olives. Rose trees were numerous, and most of the attar of roses (rose oil) of Egypt was manufactured in the province. Faiyum also raised its own variety of sheep.

== Archaeology ==
In the vicinity of the lake are many ruins of ancient villages and cities. The mounds north of the city of Faiyum mark the site of Crocodilopolis/Arsinoe. Archaeological remains across the region extend from the prehistoric period to modern times, e.g. the Monastery of the Archangel Gabriel at Naqlun.

== The cult of Sobek ==
In antiquity, the Faiyum was a center of the cult of the crocodile god Sobek. In many settlements, temples were dedicated to local manifestations of the god and associated divinities. The priests of Sobek were key players in social and economic life; for example, by organizing religious festivals or by purchasing goods from local producers. The development of temples dedicated to the Sobek cult can be studied particularly well in Bakchias, Narmouthis, Soknopaiou Nesos, Tebtunis, and Theadelphia, since many written sources (papyri, ostraka, inscriptions) on the daily life of the priests are available there.

Egyptian temples have been operating at the edges of the Fayyum at least until the early third century and in some cases in the fourth century. The institutionalized Sobek cults existed alongside early Christian communities, which settled in the region from the third century onwards and built their first churches in the Fayyum settlements by the fourth century.

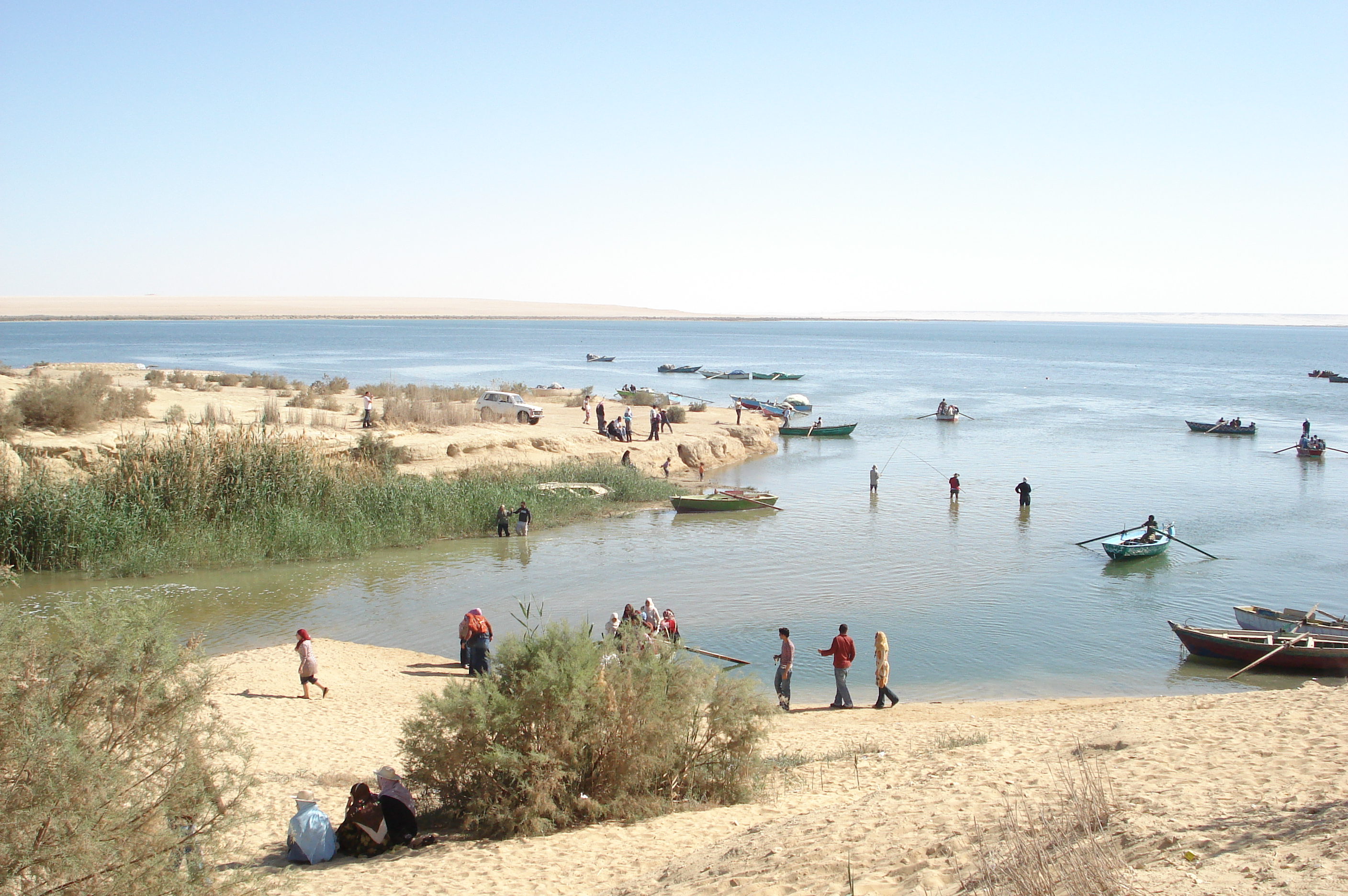
Shore of Birket Qarun, Faiyum

== Birket Qarun lake ==
Birket Qarun (Arabic for Lake of Qarun) is located in the Faiyum Oasis and has an abundant population of fish, notably bulti, of which considerable quantities are sent to Cairo. In ancient times, this lake was significantly larger, and the ancient Greeks and Romans knew it as Lake Moeris.

== Cities and towns ==
The largest city is Faiyum, which is also the capital of the Faiyum Governorate. Other towns include Sinnuris and Tamiya to the north of Faiyum, and Sanhur and Ibsheway on the road leading towards the lake. Moreover, Itsa lies to the south west of Faiyum, while the district of Youssef Al-Seddik is also part of the governorate, situated near the Tunis Village.

== In popular culture ==
The oasis is the setting for about a quarter of Paolo Coelho's The Alchemist, one of the world's top 20 best-selling books, and is featured in the YA adventure novel The Lost Temple of the Crocodile Queen by E.M. Quest. It also appears as one of the main regions in the Assassin's Creed: Origins game.

== See also ==
- Bahr Yussef canal
- Faiyum
- Fayum (fossil deposit)
- Faiyum Governorate
- Farafra
- Fayum mummy portraits
- Lake Moeris
- Kerkeosiris, ancient village in Faiyum
- Monastery of the Archangel Gabriel at Naqlun
- Pedestals of Biahmu
- Phiomia (an extinct relative of the elephant, named after Faiyum)
- Roman Egypt
