= New Faiyum =

New Faiyum الفيوم الجديدة
- City
- Location within Egypt
- Coordinates: 29°13′26″N 30°53′48″E
- Country: Egypt
- Governorate: Faiyum

Area
  - Total: 29.04 km^{2} (11.21 sq mi)

Population (2021)
  - Total: 433
  - Density: 14.9/km^{2} (38.6/sq mi)
- Time zone: UTC+2 (EET)
  - Summer (DST): UTC+3 (EEST)

New Faiyum (Arabic: الفيوم الجديدة Madīnat al-Fayyūm al-Jadīdah) is a planned city in Middle Egypt. A third-generation new Egyptian city, it is a suburb of Faiyum in Faiyum Governorate. The city is located west of the Cairo-Aswan Western Desert Road, 100 km (62 mi) south of Cairo. It is 15 km (9.3 mi) away from the city of Faiyum, and 40 km (25 mi) away from the city of Beni Suef.

== History ==
New Faiyum was founded by presidential decree in 2000.
