= Ibsheway =

Ibsheway إبشواي ⲡⲓϣⲁⲉⲓ
- City
- Location in Egypt
- Coordinates: 29.44474°N 30.710678°E
- Country: Egypt
- Governorate: Faiyum

Area
  - Total: 20.4 km^{2} (7.9 sq mi)

Population (2021)
  - Total: 86,186
  - Density: 4,220/km^{2} (10,900/sq mi)
- Time zone: UTC+2 (EET)
  - Summer (DST): UTC+3 (EEST)

Ibsheway (Arabic: إبشواي; Coptic: ⲡⲓϣⲁⲉⲓ) is a city in Faiyum Governorate, Egypt.

== History ==
Linguistic analysis links Ibsheway to the ancient village of Pisais (Greek: Πιϲάιϲ, Coptic: ⲡⲓϣⲁⲉⲓ). The association of the modern name with the Egyptian deity Shaï, along with its geographical location, strongly supports this identification.

Historical records mention Pisais 52 times, with the majority of references from the 1st to 3rd centuries and the 7th century. The earliest known mention of Pisais dates back to around 244 BC, during the Ptolemaic period, while the latest reference is found in a Coptic manuscript colophon from the 10th century. Until the 3rd century AD, Pisais is typically referred to as an epioikion rather than a village (κώμη).

No archaeological remains from antiquity have been discovered at the site.
