= Evelyne Porret =

Swiss potter (1939–2021)

Evelyne Porret (1939 – June 1, 2021) was a Swiss potter. Originally from Switzerland, she moved to the village of Tunis, in the oasis of Fayoum with partner Michel Pastore, and established a pottery school in the village in the 1980s which played a large role in creating the village's pottery culture. The pottery school still exists today.

== Life ==
Evelyne Porret was born in Switzerland. Her father was a Protestant pastor in Cairo, and her mother, a housewife. In 1960, after graduating from the School of Decorative Arts in Genèva with Philippe Lambercy, she moved to Cairo. On her first visit to Fayoum, she was accompanied by the Egyptian lyricist Sayed Hegab, who she would later marry. After regular visits to ceramics workshops across Egypt during the 1960s and 1970s, she moved in 1984 to the oasis of Fayoum, later to launch the Ptah Association for Training Urban and Rural Children in Ceramic Works, which remains the largest pottery school in Fayoum.

Porret would watch local children playing in the mud, which is abundant in the wet soil of the village that sits on the banks of Lake Qarun (Lake Moeris). As a result Porret decided to launch the village's first pottery school which would teach locals how to make a living through pottery skills.
