= Faiyum Governorate =

Governorate of Egypt

- Governorate
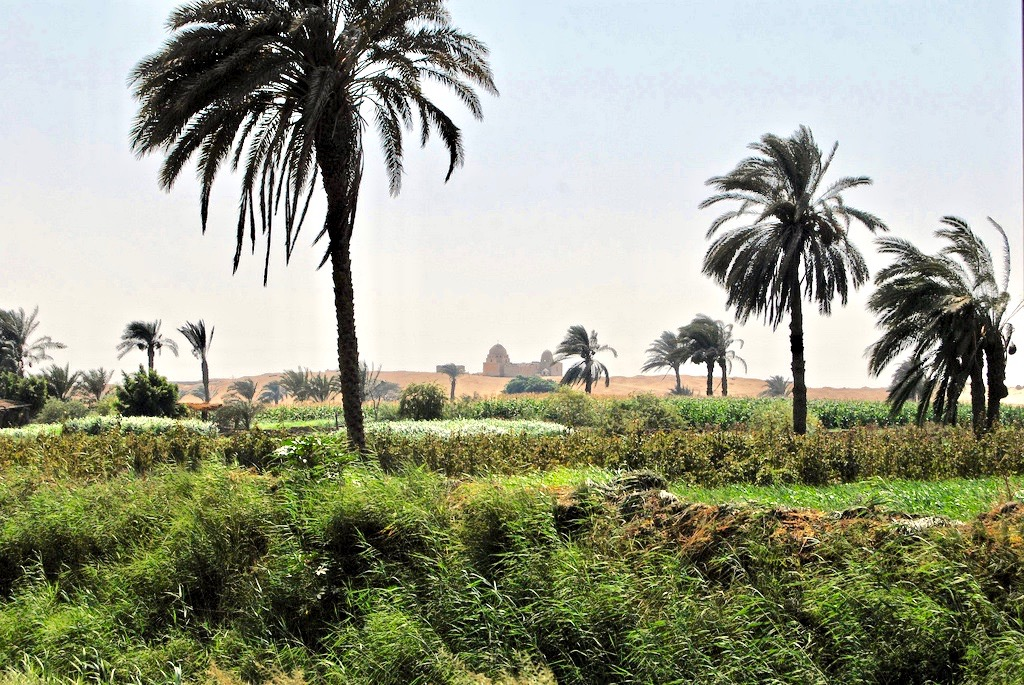
- Faiyum Oasis

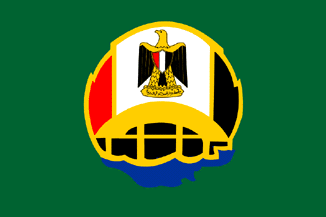
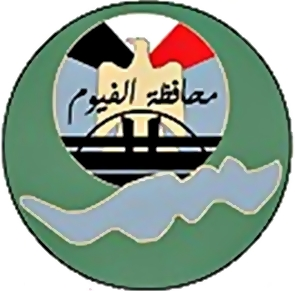
- Flag

- Faiyum Governorate on the map of Egypt
- Country: Egypt
- Seat: Faiyum (capital)

Government
  - Governor: Mohamed Hani Ghoneim

Area
  - Total: 6,068 km^{2} (2,343 sq mi)

Population (2023)
  - Total: 4,047,387
  - Density: 667.0/km^{2} (1,728/sq mi)

GDP
  - Total: EGP 134 billion (US$ 8.5 billion)
- Time zone: UTC+2 (EGY)
  - Summer (DST): UTC+3 (EEST)
- HDI (2021): 0.702 high · 18th
- Website: www.fayoum.gov.eg

Faiyum (Arabic: محافظة الفيوم Muḥāfāzah Al Fayyūm) is one of the governorates of Egypt in the middle of the country. Its capital is the city of Faiyum, located about 81 mi (130 km) south west of Cairo. It has a population of 3,848,708 (2020).

== Etymology ==
pA A i i G20 n n n N36
pA-y-m (Faiyum)
in hieroglyphs

The name Faiyum comes from Coptic ̀Ⲫⲓⲟⲙ /Ⲡⲉⲓⲟⲙ efiom/peiom (whence the proper name Ⲡⲁⲓⲟⲙ payoum), meaning the Sea or the Lake, which in turn comes from late Egyptian pA y-m of the same meaning, a reference to the nearby Lake Moeris.

== Overview ==
The rate of poverty is more than 60% in this governorate but recently some social safety networks have been provided in the form of financial assistance and job opportunities. The funding has been coordinated by the country's Ministry of Finance and with assistance from international organizations.

== Municipal divisions ==
The governorate is divided into the following municipal divisions for administrative purposes, with a total estimated population as of April 2025 of 4,206,852. In some instances there is a markaz and a kism with the same name.

Municipal Divisions
Anglicized name	Native name	Arabic transliteration	Population (January 2023 Est.)	Type
Al Shawashna	مركز الشواشنة	Al-Shawashnah	257,768	Markaz
Faiyum	مركز الفيوم	Al-Fayyūm	625,249	Markaz
Faiyum 1	قسم أول الفيوم	Al-Fayyūm 1	281,676	Kism (fully urban)
Faiyum 2	قسم ثان الفيوم	Al-Fayyūm 2	248,210	Kism (fully urban)
Ibsheway	مركز إبشواى	Ibshawāy	467,862	Markaz
Itsa	مركز إطسا	Iṭsā	797,962	Markaz
New Faiyum	مدينة الفيوم الجديدة	Madīnat al-Fayyūm al-Jadīdah	442	New City
Sinnuris	مركز سنورس	Sinnūris	714,085	Markaz
Tamiya	مركز طامية	Ṭāmiyah	502,444	Markaz
Yousef El Seddik	مركز يوسف الصديق	Yūsuf aṣ-Ṣiddīq incl. Ash-Shawāshnah	151,689	Markaz

== Geography ==
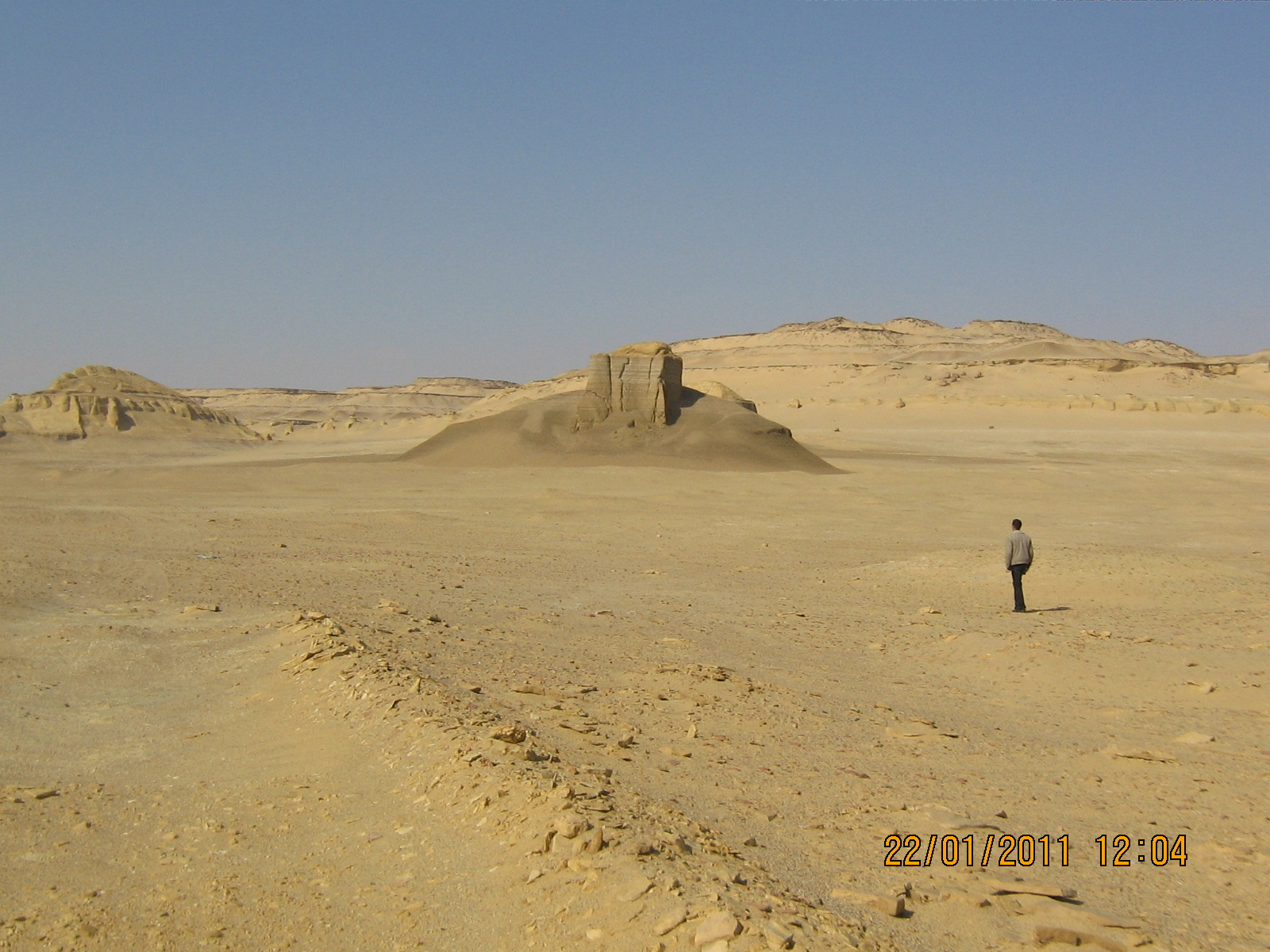
Landscape northwards of lake Moeris

The governorate of Faiyum includes:

- The large fertile Faiyum Oasis, which comprises farmland, Lake Moeris, and some cities.
- South of the Faiyum Oasis, a smaller depression contains the town of El Gharaq el Sulţāni. It is also irrigated from the Nile.
- A dry barren depression named Wadi El Rayan, which covers 280 mi² (725 km²), west of the El Gharaq el Sulţāni depression.
- Desert and dry mountains, which mostly surround the depressions.

== Population ==
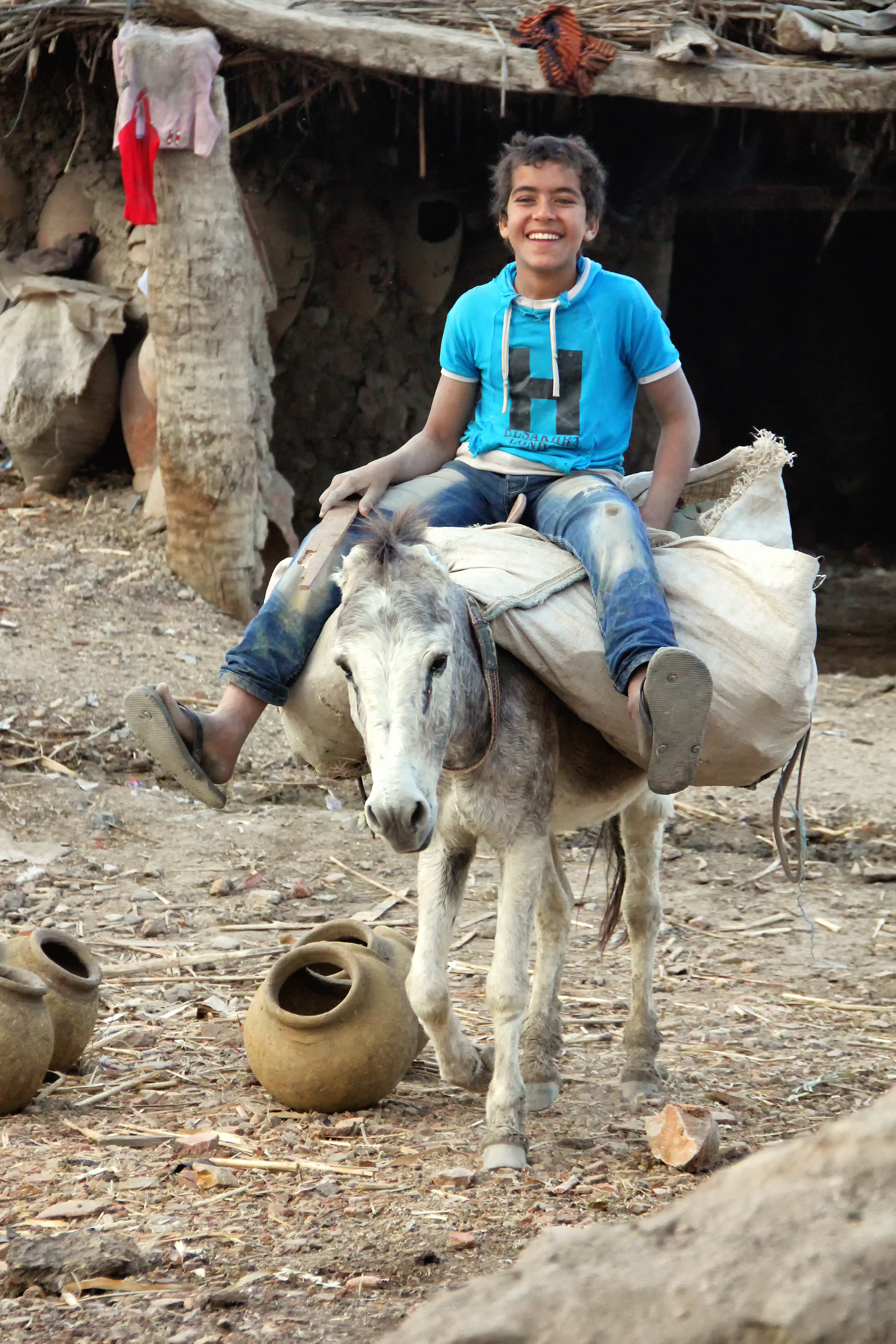
Boy of Nazla, one of the pottery production sites at Faiyum

According to population estimates from 2015 the majority of residents in the governorate live in rural areas, with an urbanization rate of only 22.5%. Out of an estimated 3,170,150 people residing in the governorate, 2,456,368 people lived in rural areas and only 713,782 lived in urban areas.

== Industrial zones ==
According to the Governing Authority for Investment and Free Zones (GAFI), the following industrial zones are located in Faiyum:

Zone name
Kom Oshim Industrial Zone
Kutah Industrial Zone
New Faiyum Industrial Zone

== Notable people ==
- Aly Lotfy Mahmoud
- Ahmed Fakhry
- Arafa El Sayed
- Fawzia Fahim
- Hamdi Abu Golayyel
- Pope John XVIII of Alexandria
- Magdy Atwa
- Mariam Fakhr Eddine
- Mohamed Abdelwahab
- Mohamed Ihab
- Saadia Gaon
- Sayed Abdel Hafeez
- Sayed Moawad
- Sabri Raheel
- Sufi Abu Taleb
- Tefta Tashko-Koço
- Youssef Wahbi
- Yousef Wali
- Zakariyya Ahmad

== See also ==
- Bahr Yussef
- Egyptian Faiyumi
- Lake El Rayan
- Fayum mummy portraits are paintings from the 1st century BC to the 3rd century AD.
