= Fayoumi =

Breed of chicken

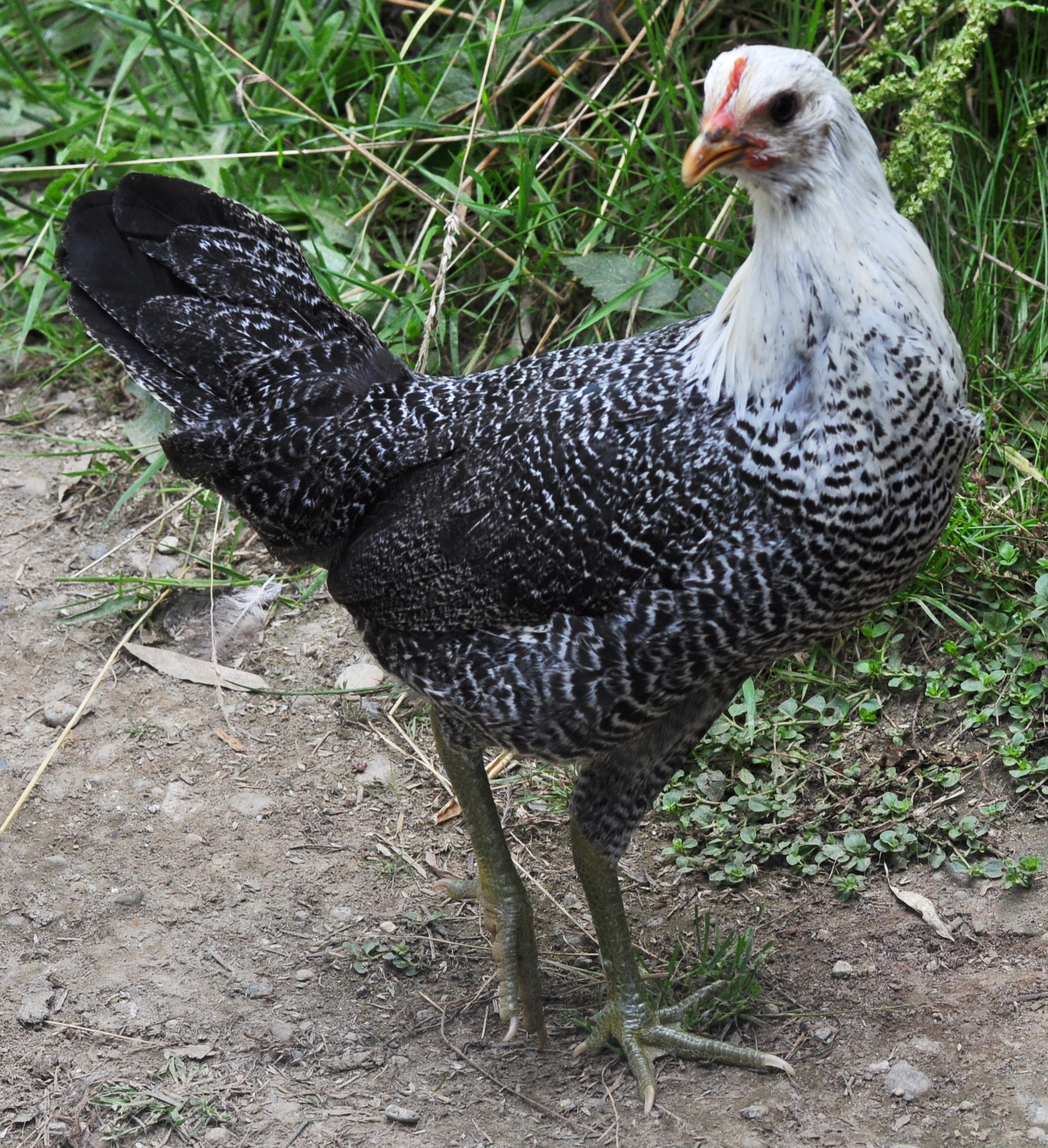
- A Fayoumi pullet
- Other names: Egyptian Fayoumi; Bigawe
- Country of origin: Egypt

Traits
- Weight: Male: Standard: 1.35–1.8 kg Bantam: 430 g; Female: Standard: 0.9–1.6 kg Bantam: 400 g
- Skin color: slate blue
- Egg color: white or cream
- Comb type: single

Classification
- APA: no
- EE: no
- PCGB: rare soft feather: light
- Chicken; Gallus gallus domesticus

The Fayoumi or Egyptian Fayoumi also known in Egypt as Bigawi is an Egyptian breed of chicken. It originates from—and is named for—the governorate of Fayoum, which lies south-west of Cairo and west of the Nile. It is believed to be an ancient breed.

== History ==
The Fayoumi is believed to be an ancient breed.

In the 1940s some eggs were imported from Egypt to the United States by a dean of agriculture from Iowa State University, and the birds hatched from them were cross-bred with American chickens. It was believed that the Egyptian birds might have a greater resistance to bacterial and viral infection than the American stock. The Fayoumi is not recognized by the American Poultry Association, and is not included in its Standard of Perfection.

The Fayoumi was first imported to the United Kingdom in 1984. Two colour varieties are recognised, silver-pencilled and gold-pencilled.

== Characteristics ==
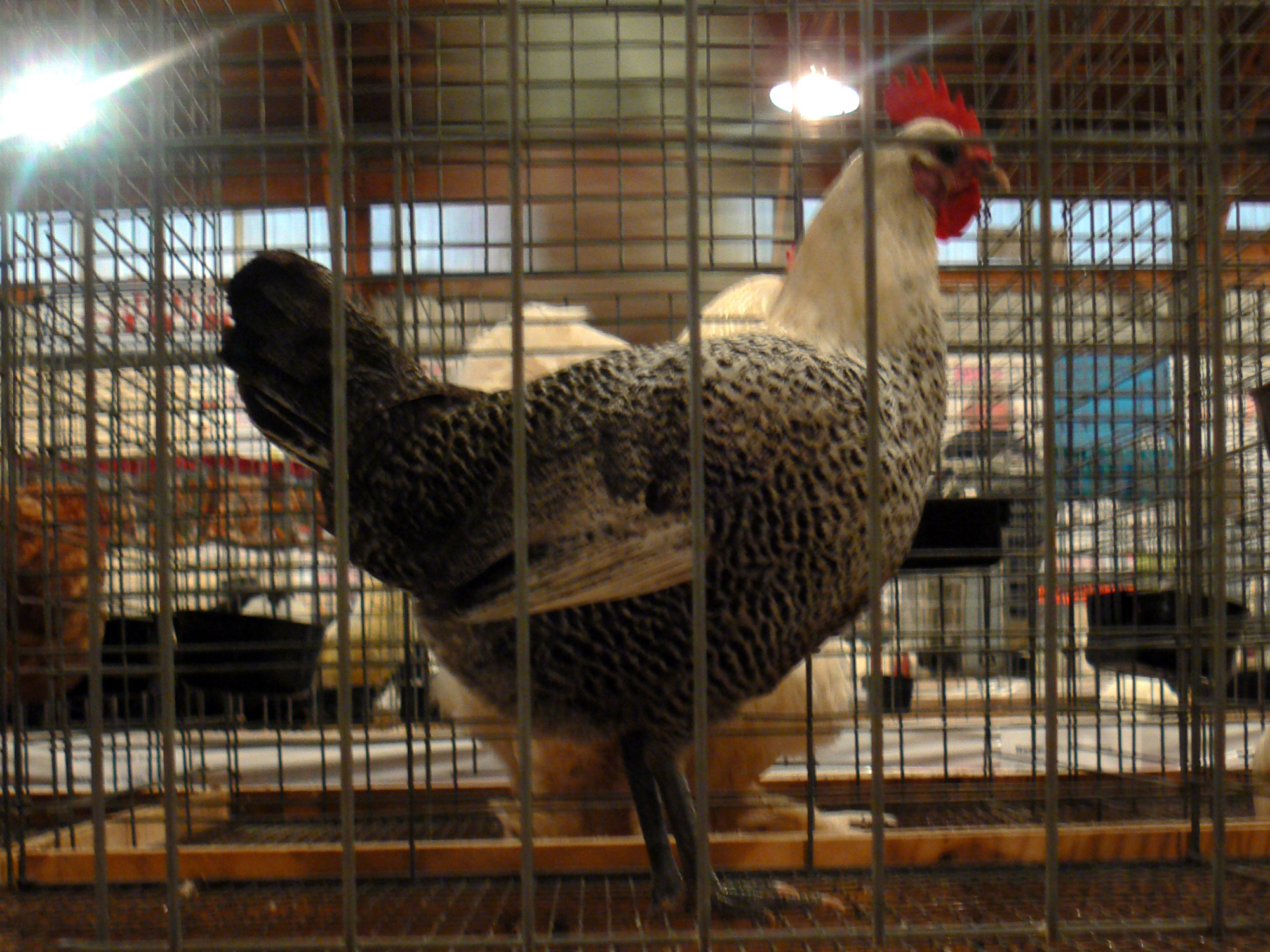
A Fayoumi at a poultry show

The Fayoumi has a single comb, with even serrations. The comb, earlobes and wattles are bright red; the eyes are dark brown, the beak and toenails horn-coloured. Two colour varieties are recognised: silver-pencilled and gold-pencilled; the colour pattern of the plumage shows similarity to that of the Belgian Braekel.

The bantam Fayoumi is similar to the standard-sized bird in every respect, but weighs about 400 g.

== Use ==
The Fayoumi is a hardy breed, well suited to hot climates. It forages well, and is suited to free-range management. Hens lay a good number of small white or cream eggs. They are not given to broodiness as pullets, but can be when they reach two or three years of age. The breed is fast to mature, with hens laying by four and half months, and cockerels crowing at five or six weeks.
