= Pedestals of Biahmu =

Remnants of two colossal statues erected by Amenemhat III

Coordinates: 29°22′30″N 30°51′24″E

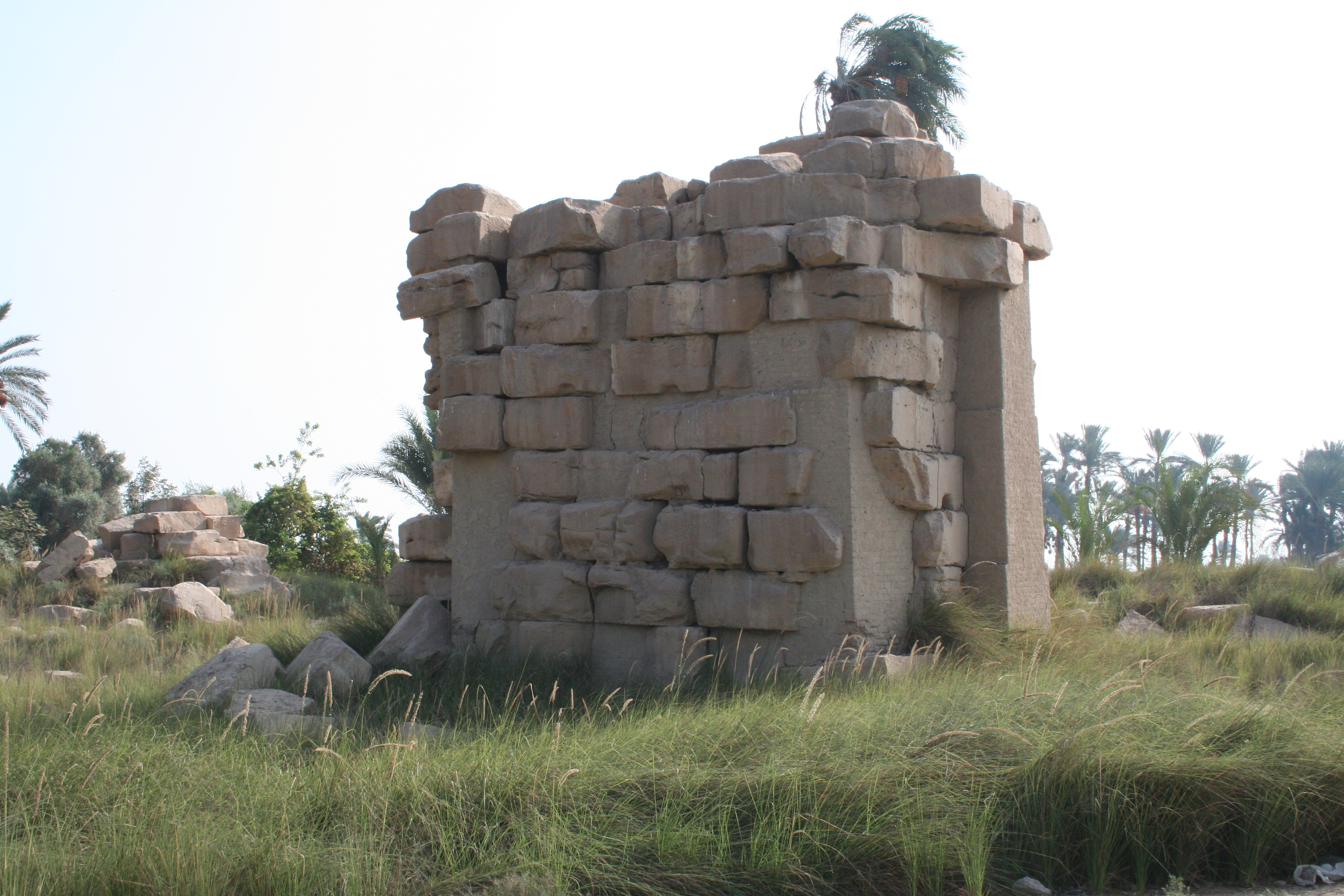
One of the Pedestals of Biahmu (2006)

The Pedestals of Biahmu (also spelled Biyahmū) are the basal remnants of two colossal statues erected by the ancient Egyptian pharaoh Amenemhat III. The ruins, which once stood on the shore of Lake Moeris, are located in the village of Biahmu, 4 miles (6.4 km) north of the city Faiyum. The actual statues were long ago destroyed and only their bases have survived.

== Name ==
The pedestals are known by a variety of names, including the "Colossi of Biahmu" and the "Pyramids of Biahmu". Locally, they are often referred to as Al-Ṣanam (الصنم), which is Arabic for "The Idol". Historically, the ruins have also been called Haram Biyahmū ("Pyramid of Biahmu"), Rigl Pharaon (رجل فرعون "The Foot of the Pharaoh"), and Mustuhamel ("The Bathed").

== History ==
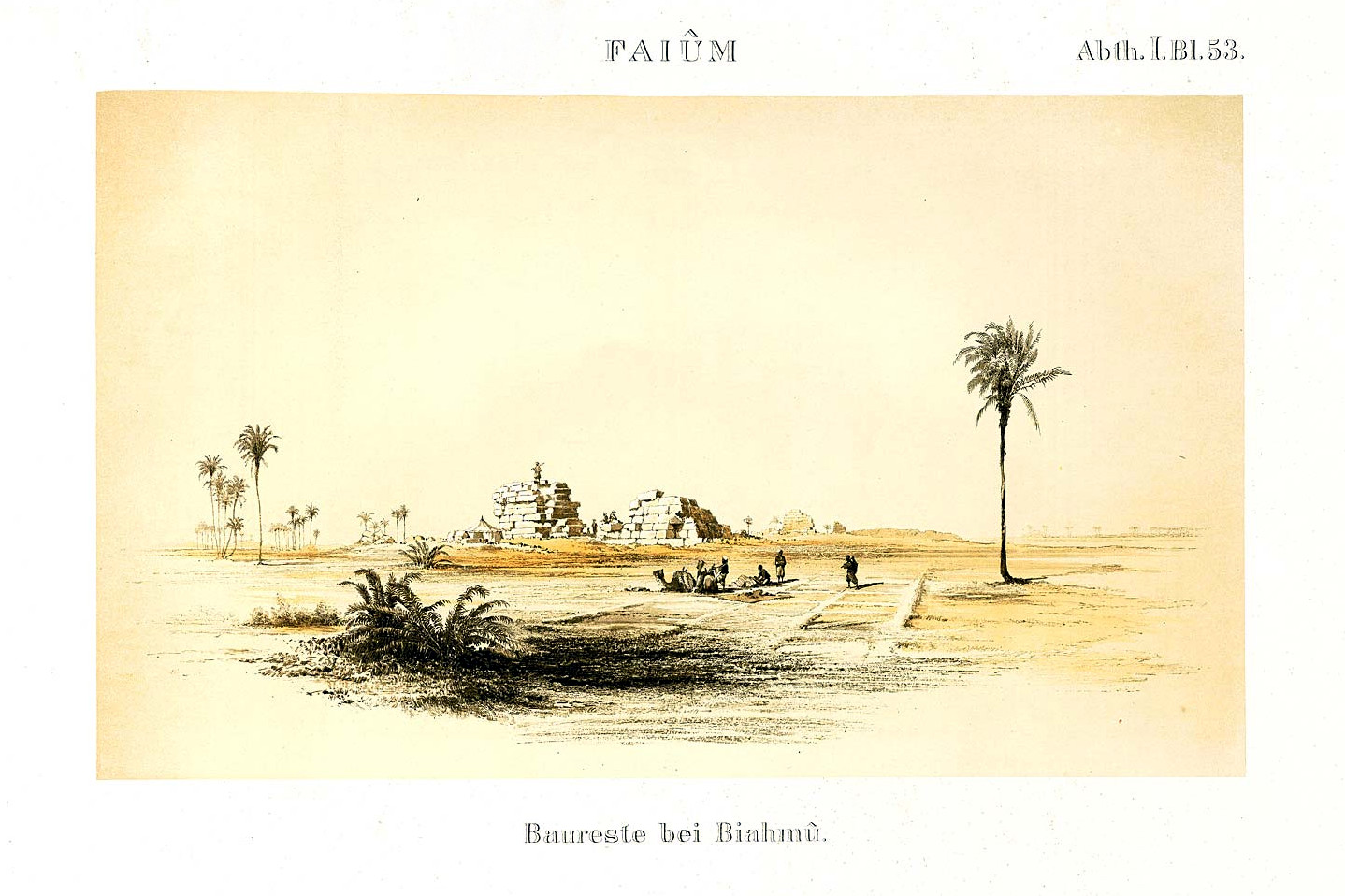
A drawing of the ruins made by Karl Richard Lepsius in 1849

The first mention of the statues can be found in the work of the Greek historian Herodotus (fl. 5th century BC), who claims in his Histories that "in the centre [of Lake Moeris] there stand two pyramids, rising to the height of fifty fathoms above the surface of the water, and extending as far beneath, crowned each of them with a colossal statue sitting upon a throne." Herodotus's claim that the statues towered "fifty fathoms" above the lake is almost certainly "grossly inflated". Additionally, given the impracticality of building pyramids in water, the British Egyptologist William Matthew Flinders Petrie hypothesizes that Herodotus wrote of these statues during a time that the area had flooded. Claims similar to those made by Herodotus were later repeated by Diodorus the Sicilian (fl. 1st century BC) and Pliny the Elder (AD 23/24 – 79).

In 1245, the Arabic writer Abu Osman el-Nabulsi el-Safadi reported that the tops of both statues had been partially destroyed in the search for supposed treasures. In 1672, the theologian Johann Michael Vansleb wrote that he could only make out the remains of one of the two statues, and by the time the English travel writer Richard Pococke visited the site in 1737, only the bases remained. In the 19th century, William Matthew Flinders Petrie studied the site, as did Labib Habachi in the 1940s. Habachi provided evidence that the statues had been raised by Amenemhat III, and Petrie argued that each were originally 60 feet (18 m) tall and surrounded by a courtyard with embanked walls. On the plinths were carved representations of the 42 nomes (territorial divisions) of ancient Egypt. The statues once stood on a causeway flanking Lake Moeris. Between them was a road that led to the ancient city of Arsinoe (i.e., Crocodilopolis).
