= Sinnuris =

Sinnuris سنورس
- City
- Location in Egypt
- Coordinates: 29.407222°N 30.866667°E
- Country: Egypt
- Governorate: Faiyum

Area
  - Total: 225.1 km^{2} (86.9 sq mi)

Population (2021)
  - Total: 692,701
  - Density: 3,077/km^{2} (7,970/sq mi)
- Time zone: UTC+2 (EET)
  - Summer (DST): UTC+3 (EEST)

Sinnuris (Arabic: سنورس, from Coptic: ⲡⲯⲓⲛⲟⲩⲣⲉⲥ) is a city in the Faiyum Governorate, Egypt. Its population was estimated at 134,000 people in 2021.
