= Bahr Yussef =

Canal which connects the Nile River with Fayyum in Egypt

Coordinates: 29.241473°N 30.916729°E

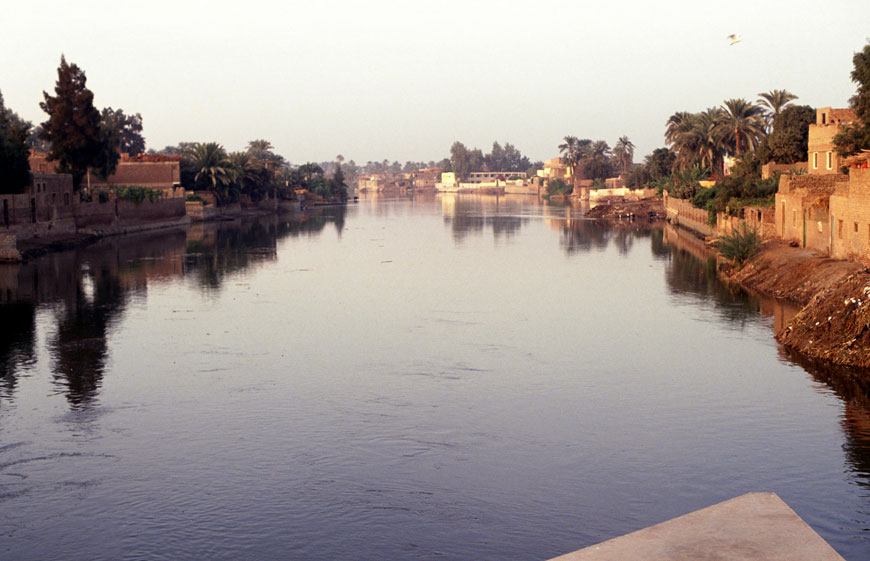
Bahr Yussef near the town of Minya

The Bahr Yussef (Arabic: بحر يوسف; "the waterway of Joseph") is a canal which connects the Nile River with Faiyum Oasis in Egypt.

In ancient times it was called Tomis (Ancient Greek: Τωμις) by the Greeks, which was derived from its Egyptian name Tm.t ("ending canal"). That name was still in use after the Arab conquest, translated into Arabic as al-Manhi (Arabic: المنهى). It was also known as "the Great canal" (Ancient Greek: διῶρυξ Μεγάλη) or "the canal of Moeris". The modern Arabic name refers to the prophet Yusuf, the Arabic spelling of Joseph.

In prehistoric times, the canal was a natural distributary of the Nile which created a lake to the west during high floods. Beginning with the Twelfth Dynasty, the waterway was enlarged and the Fayyum was developed to enlarge Lake Moeris (now Birket Qarun). It's thought that the pharaoh responsible for its construction is Amenemhat III, since he was referred to by the Greeks as "King Moeris".

The canal was built into the natural incline of the valley, creating a channel 15 km long and 5 m deep that sloped into the Fayyum depression. The canal was controlled by the Ha-Uar Dam, which was actually two dams that regulated the flow into the lake and out of the Nile. As the surrounding area changed at about 230 BC, the Bahr Yussef eventually became neglected, leaving most of Lake Moeris to dry up, creating the depression that exists today and the modern Faiyum Oasis.

During the medieval period, the canal was still a major communication axis to connect Fayyum to Cairo.

The Bahr Yussef still exists today, feeding water northwards into the Faiyum Oasis, parallel with the Nile.
