= Lake Moeris =

Ancient endorheic lake in Egypt

Lake Qarun
- Lake Moeris
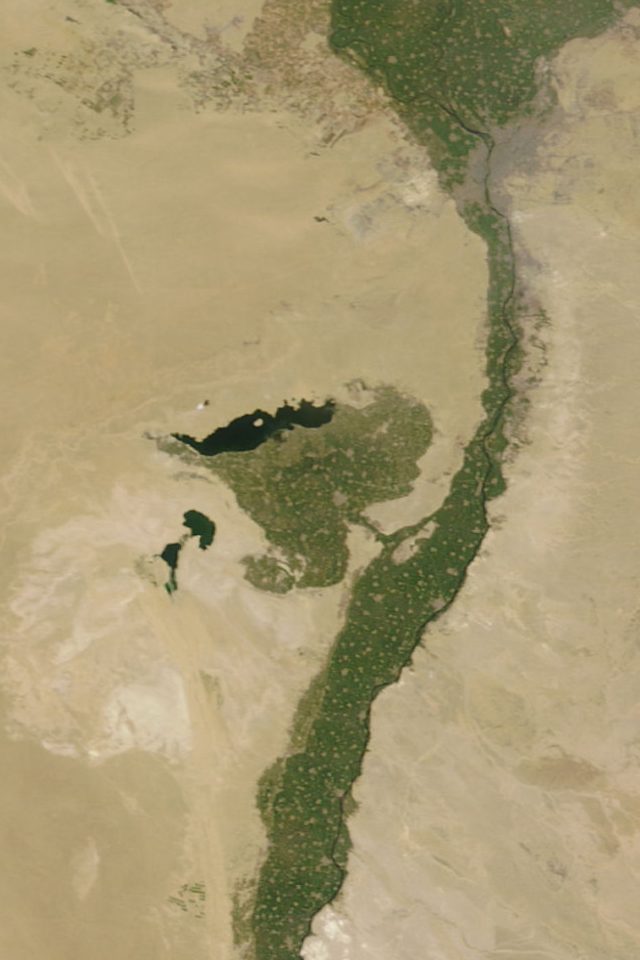
- Satellite image of the Faiyum Oasis, with Lake Qarun in its interior
- Interactive map of Lake Qarun
- Location: Faiyum Governorate, Egypt
- Primary inflows: Nile River (via the Bahr Yussef)
- Basin countries: Egypt
- Surface area: 202 km^{2} (78 sq mi)
- Surface elevation: 43 m (141 ft)
- Frozen: No
- Settlements: Faiyum Governorate
Designations
Ramsar Wetland
- Official name: Lake Qarun Protected Area
- Designated: 4 June 2012
- Reference no.: 2040

Lake Moeris (Ancient Greek: Μοῖρις, genitive Μοίριδος) was an ancient endorheic freshwater lake located in the Faiyum Oasis, 80 km (50 mi) southwest of Cairo, Egypt, which persists today at a fraction of its former size as the hypersaline Lake Qarun (Arabic: بركة قارون). In prehistory it was fed intermittently by the Nile via the ancient Hawara Channel, fluctuating in level throughout the Paleolithic and Neolithic periods. The prehistoric Lake Moeris spanned much of the area of the modern Faiyum Oasis, with a total area estimated at between 1,270 km^{2} (490 sq mi) and 1,700 km^{2} (660 sq mi).

During the Middle Kingdom, excavation of the Hawara Channel to create the canal now known as the Bahr Yussef increased the volume of inflow into Lake Moeris, and concurrent drainage and land reclamation projects would see the lake exploited for agricultural purposes. Further drainage and reclamation during the early Ptolemaic Kingdom effectively severed Lake Moeris' direct connection to the Nile and began a gradual trend of recession that continued through the Roman, medieval and early modern periods, resulting in the Lake Qarun of the present day. The modern lake's surface is 43 m (141 ft) below sea-level, and covers about 202 km^{2} (78 sq mi).

A number of Eurasian water bird species migrating from more northerly latitudes use Lake Qarun as a wintering ground, and as such the lake and its surroundings constitute a protected area under Egyptian law. Its high salinity has led to most Nilotic freshwater fish species disappearing from the lake, although a number of saltwater or otherwise salt-tolerant species have been introduced to its waters to bolster the local fishing economy; major fisheries in the area include tilapia, mullet and sole. Lake Qarun was designated a Ramsar site in 2012.

Lake Moeris lends its name to the extinct proboscidean mammal Moeritherium, a distant relative of modern elephants first described from the nearby Qasr el Sagha Formation.

== Etymology ==
N36 wr n n n
mer-wer (Moeris)
in hieroglyphs

The name "Lake Moeris" is derived from the Greek translation (Μοῖρῐς λίμνη Limne Moeris) of the Egyptian place-name mr-wr (lit. "Great Canal"). This name is likely a reference to the Bahr Yussef, and as the pharaoh responsible for its construction Amenemhat III was referred to by the Greeks as "King Moeris". In Late Egyptian, the lake was referred to as the Piôm, a name derived from the Egyptian phrase pꜣ-ym (lit. "the Sea"); Piôm would later be transliterated into Coptic as Ⲫⲓⲟⲙ/Ⲡⲉⲓⲟⲙ (epʰiom/peiom), from which the modern Arabic name الفيوم (el-Fayyūm) (and by extension the romanized Faiyum) is derived.

== History ==
=== Prehistory ===
During the Messinian Salinity Crisis of the late Miocene, the Nile flowed past the empty Faiyum basin at the bottom of a large canyon which reached some 2.4 kilometres (1.5 mi) deep where the city of Cairo now sits. Although the mechanism of the Faiyum basin's creation was subject to some scholarly debate among geologists in the early 20th century, the consensus view remains that the basin itself emerged primarily as a consequence of wind erosion. After the Mediterranean re-flooded at the end of the Miocene, the Nile canyon became a gulf of the sea which extended inland to the site of present-day Kom Ombo. Over the course of geological time this inlet of the Mediterranean gradually filled with silt and became the Nile valley.

Sometime prior to the Middle Paleolithic, the silt of the Nile valley accumulated enough for the flooding Nile to overflow into the Faiyum basin through the Hawara Channel, creating the ancient Lake Moeris; this earliest iteration of the lake was fed solely by subsequent, intermittent floods of the Nile, and is thought to have dried up entirely at the end of the Paleolithic before reappearing at the beginning of the Neolithic. Stone flakes found along the margins of the Faiyum basin matching those produced by the Levallois technique suggest that the shores of Lake Moeris were inhabited by humans as far back as the Middle Paleolithic. Other archaeological work in the Faiyum basin, particularly that of Gertrude Caton-Thompson and Elinor Wight Gardner, has recovered evidence of numerous Epipaleolithic and Neolithic settlements.

=== Initial development: Old and Middle Kingdoms ===
Lake Moeris is first recorded from about 3000 BCE, around the time of Narmer (Menes). By the beginning of the Old Kingdom a permanent settlement, Shedet, had been erected on the high ground of the lake's southeastern bank; Shedet would go on to become the major cult center of the Egyptian god Sobek, an association which would lead to the city receiving the Greek name of Krokodeilópolis (Κροκοδειλόπολις, lit. "Crocodile City"), later rendered in Latin as Crocodīlopolis. The modern city of Faiyum now occupies the site.

The first major manmade alterations to Lake Moeris occurred during the Middle Kingdom under the kings of the Twelfth Dynasty, who ruled from the Faiyum region following the move to the new royal capital of Itjtawy. Senusret II initiated irrigation and land reclamation projects to free up portions of the lake interior for agricultural use, pushing the edge of the lake further outwards from Shedet. His grandson Amenemhat III went on to commission an extensive excavation of the Hawara Channel, creating the canal known today as the Bahr Yussef. This canal increased the volume of water flowing into Lake Moeris from the Nile to more effectively irrigate the Faiyum basin, transforming it into a major agricultural center, and as a result, Amenemhat III was later known in Greek as "King Moeris". In addition to its role as a freshwater reservoir, the lake was also used as part of a freight transport system; basalt blocks mined from a nearby quarry were conveyed to the lake via the Lake Moeris Quarry Road, the oldest known paved road in the world. From the lake, the blocks could be shipped to the Giza Necropolis to be used in the construction of temples and monuments. The ASCE has entered the Quarry Road into its List of Historic Civil Engineering Landmarks.

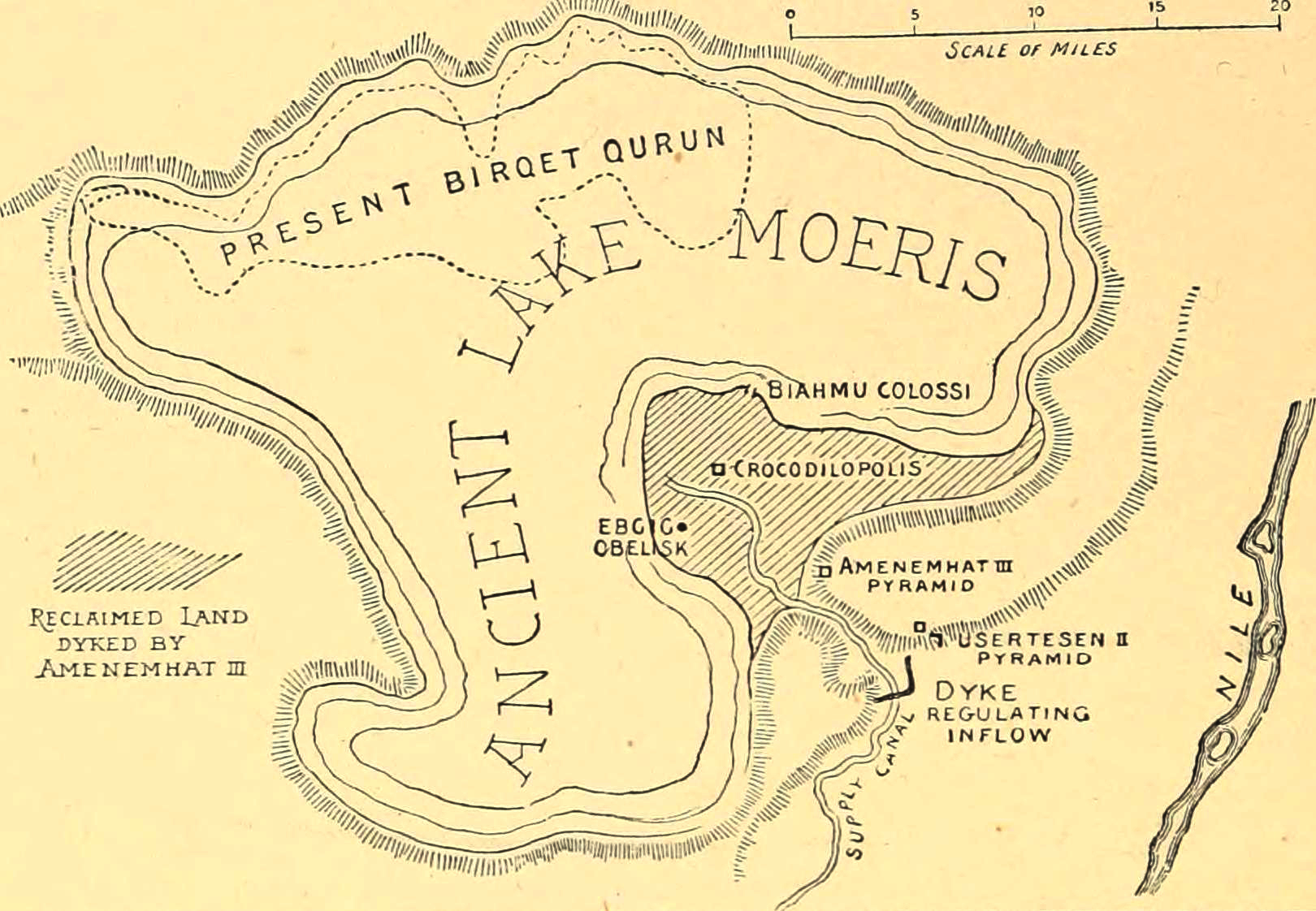
An image map of notable monuments in the vicinity of the former Lake Moeris. The hatched area denotes land reclaimed by the kings of the Twelfth Dynasty.

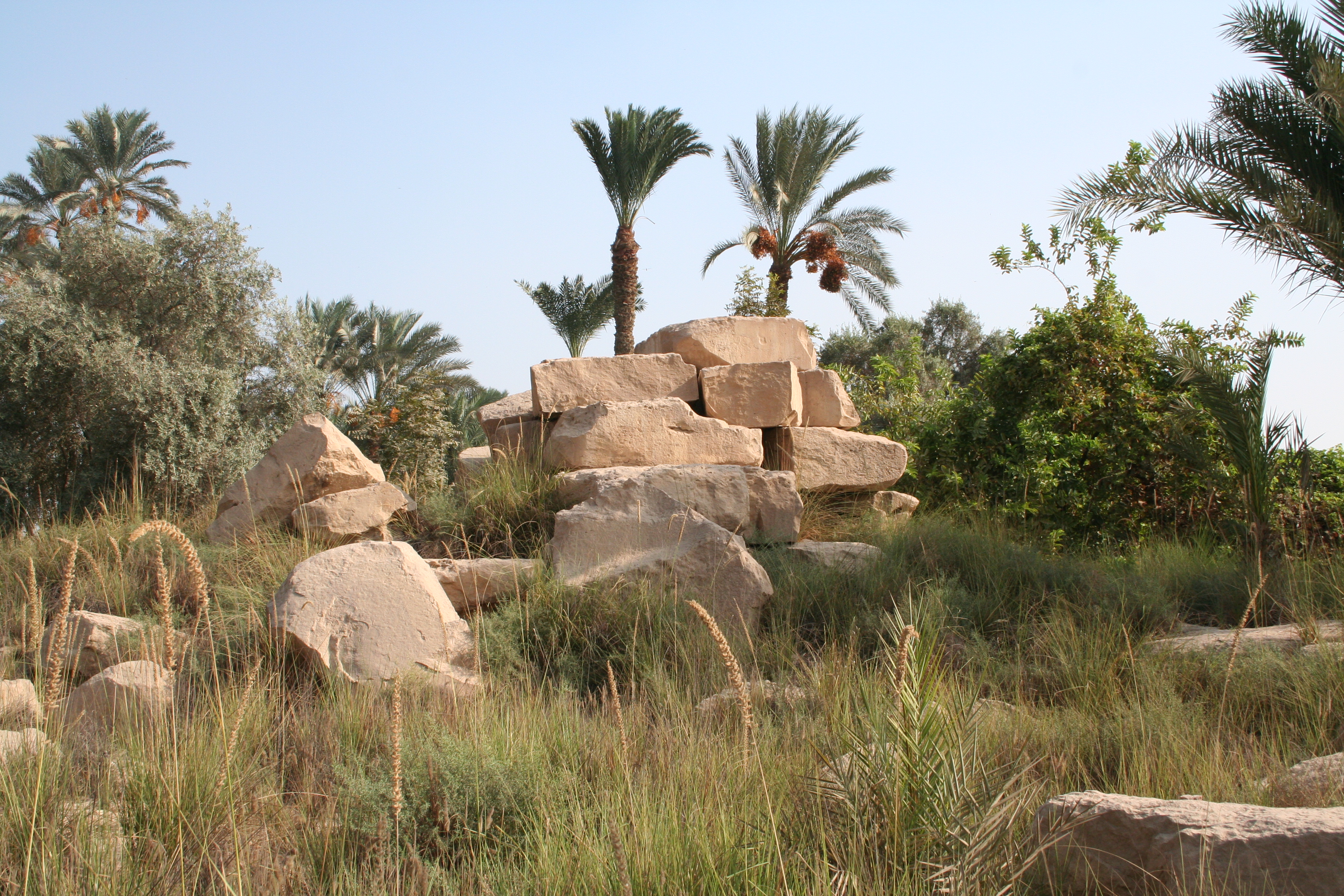
Ruins of one of the Pedestals of Biahmu

In his book Histories, the Greek historian Herodotus claims to have visited Lake Moeris, situating it below the Labyrinth of Egypt and opposite the ancient city of Crocodilopolis (i.e., the modern city of Faiyum). Herodotus also states that two "pyramids" (interpreted to be the Pedestals of Biahmu) stood in the middle of the lake, a claim that led the British Egyptologist Flinders Petrie to hypothesize that the lake was flooded when Herodotus had visited the area. The immense waterworks undertaken by the kings of the Twelfth Dynasty to transform the lake into a freshwater reservoir left classical geographers such as Herodotus with the impression that the lake itself was an artificial excavation – an interpretation not borne out by modern evidence.

=== Later development: Ptolemaic Kingdom and Roman Egypt ===
Following the death of Alexander the Great, Egypt came under the control of his former general Ptolemy, who would become the first king of the Ptolemaic dynasty. With this new governance and the concurrent influx of Greek and Macedonian colonists into Egypt, the Faiyum basin and Lake Moeris was developed further to enhance its capacity as an agricultural center. The royal engineers of Ptolemy II Philadelphus constructed additional canals and levees, as well as a dam on the Bahr Yussef to regulate the inflow of the Nile, allowing for further settlement of the basin and increased grain production as the lake's waters receded and exposed new fertile soils. Numerous papyri recovered from Ptolemaic-era sites in the Faiyum (often from waste papyrus used for cartonnage) preserve correspondence between engineers and administrators during this period of development, including the archive of Zenon of Kaunos. The impeded flow of the Nile into Lake Moeris following the construction of the dam marked the beginning of the lake's gradual evaporative shrinkage, a process that would ultimately result in the diminished Lake Qarun of the modern era.

By the end of the Ptolemaic Kingdom, routine maintenance of this irrigation system had been neglected due to internal strife, causing croplands within the Faiyum to either dry up or become totally inundated. The annexation of Egypt as a Roman province saw the renovation of Lake Moeris' hydraulic works by Roman troops under Augustus, thereby contributing to Egypt's status as the breadbasket of the early Roman Empire. The revitalization of agriculture within the Faiyum was met with another wave of settlement and the area saw sustained productivity until the Crisis of the Third Century, when another civil war destabilized the region and the irrigation system once again fell into disrepair. Following this period of unrest the emperor Probus, much like Augustus, employed Roman soldiers to re-renovate the canals and dykes and the area became productive once again, though over time the systems were yet again neglected and the Roman settlements became defunct; the area is thought to have been mostly abandoned by the 5th century, with only a small area in the interior of the Faiyum basin remaining cultivated and inhabited through the remainder of the Middle Ages.

== Ecology and fisheries ==
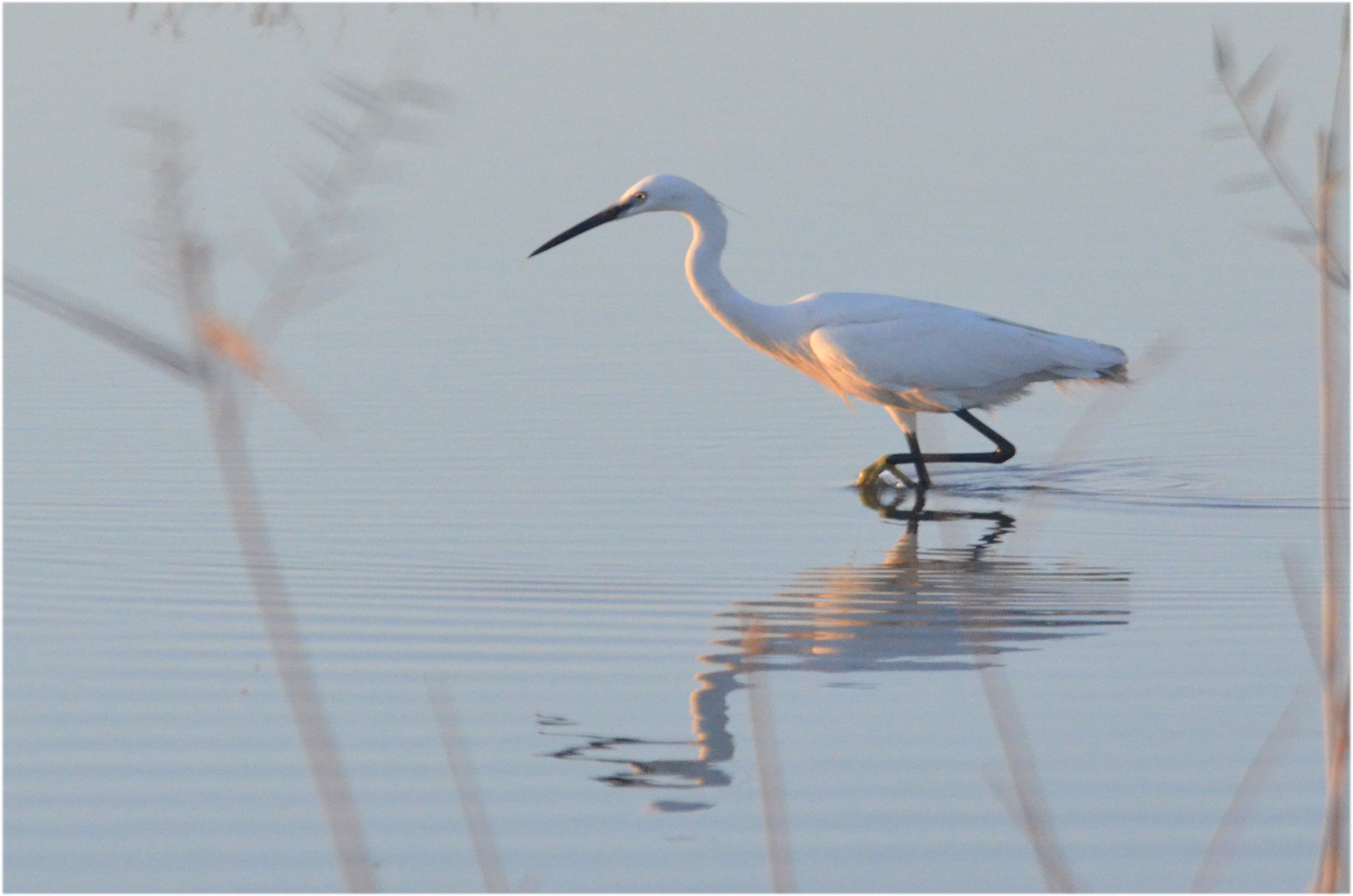
Little egrets and many other Eurasian water birds migrate to Lake Qarun for the winter.

In the present day, Lake Qarun serves as a wintering or nesting ground for nearly 88 different species of water birds. Collared pratincoles, Kentish and Kittlitz's plovers and little terns all gather at the lake to breed, while Eurasian winter migrants include black-necked and great crested grebes, great and little egrets, and a variety of duck species such as common shelducks, Eurasian teals, Eurasian wigeons, northern pintails, northern shovelers and tufted ducks. Lake Qarun's status as crucial bird habitat has led to its designation as both an Egyptian protectorate and a Ramsar site.

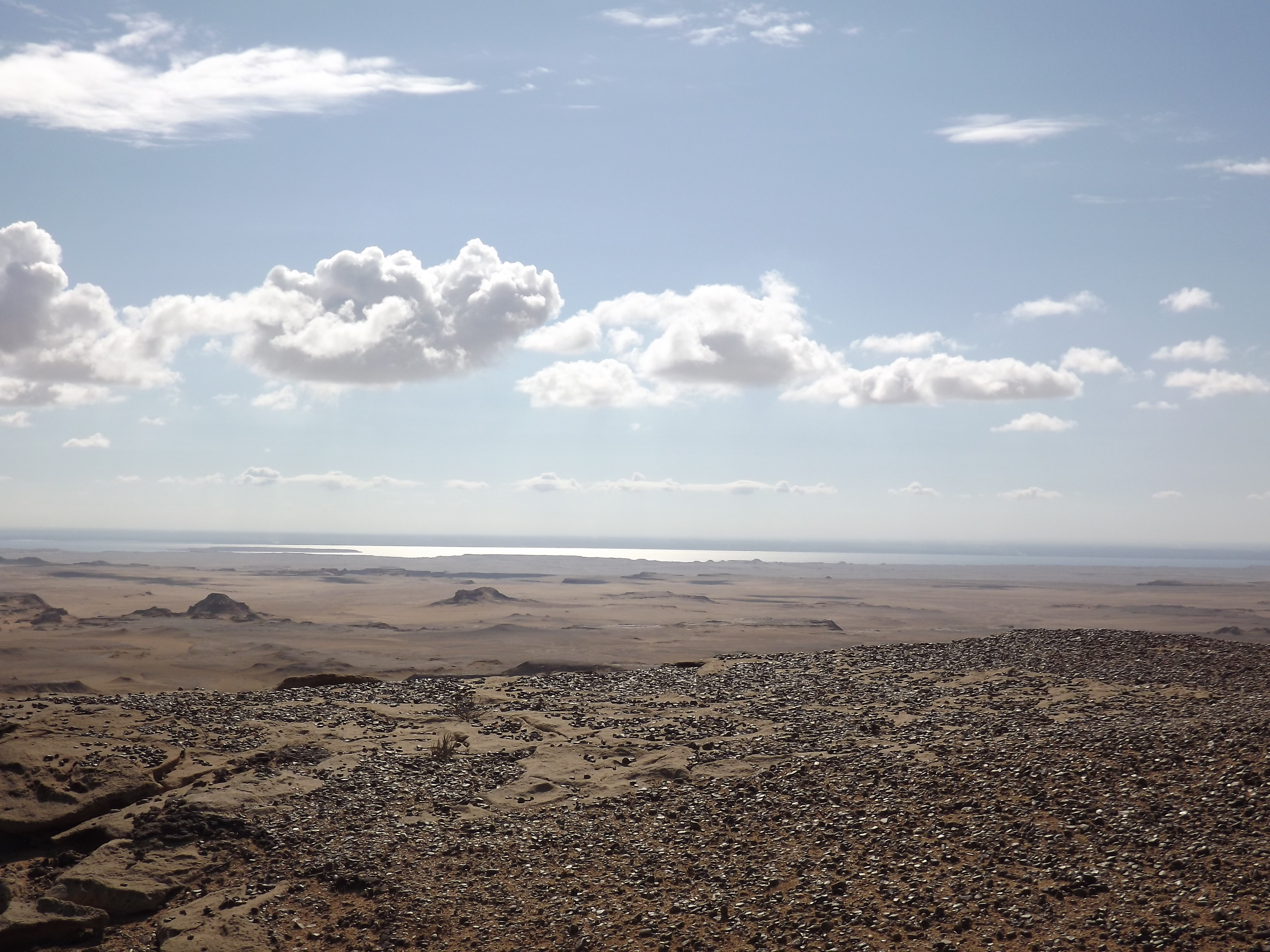
Lake Qarun as seen from the Lake Qarun Protected Area

The increasing salinity and turbidity of Lake Qarun has been implicated in the extirpation of most Nilotic fish species originally present in the lake, such as Nile perch and Nile tilapia; a few species like redbelly tilapia appear to have weathered this trend. To prevent the collapse of the local fishing economy in the wake of changing environmental conditions, a variety of marine and salt-tolerant fish and crustacean species have been transplanted to the lake since the early 20th century, including big-scale sand smelt, Egyptian sole, European seabass and gilt-head bream, as well as multiple species of both mullet and prawn. Introduced mullets and sole, along with the native tilapia, remain the largest commercial fisheries in Lake Qarun, but factors such as continued evaporation of the lake, increased pollution from agricultural runoff and invasive cymothoid isopods have caused fish catches to drop off sharply over the past decade.

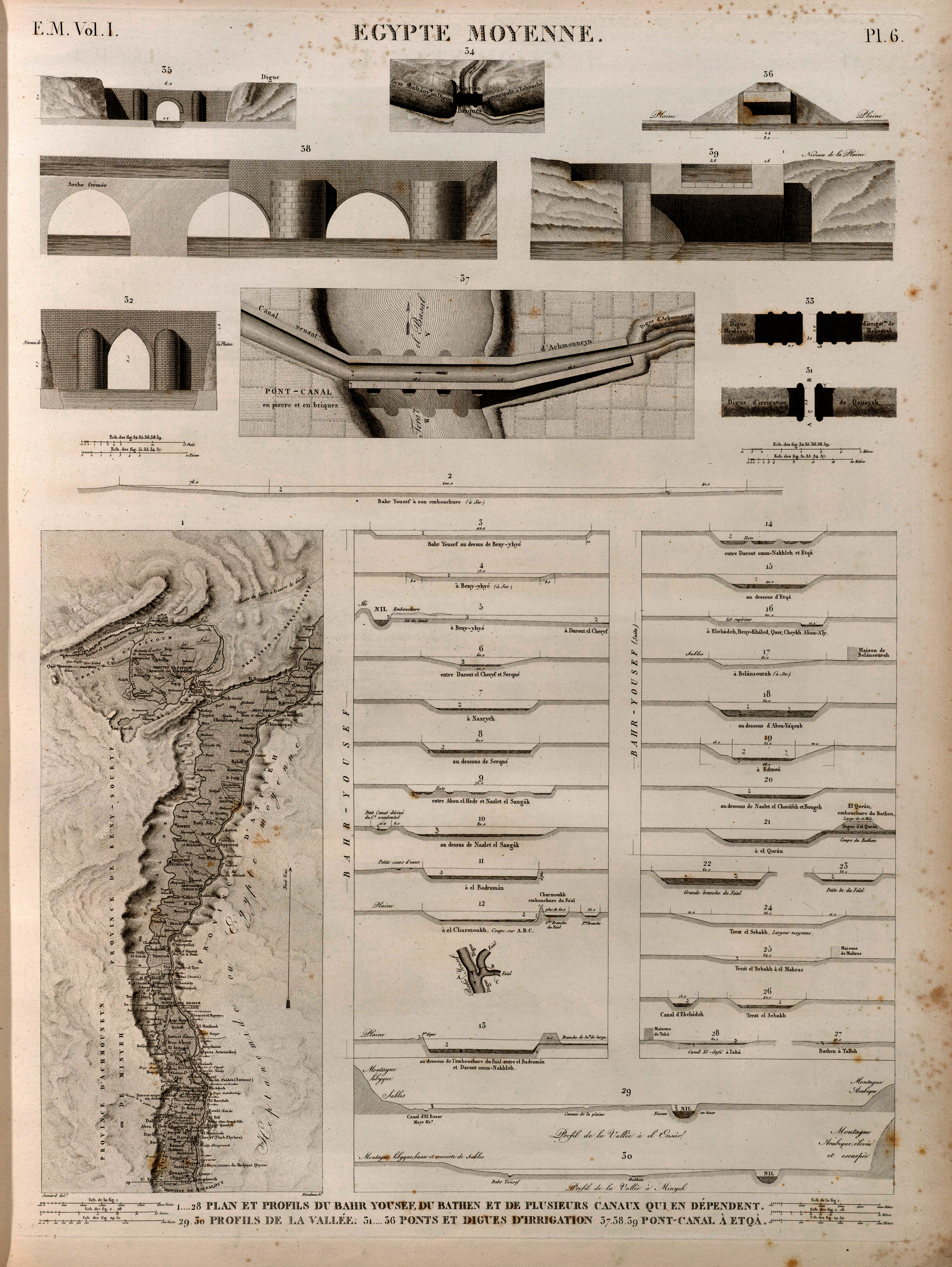
Plan and profile of the Bahr Yousef, Valley Profiles; Irrigation bridges and dykes;

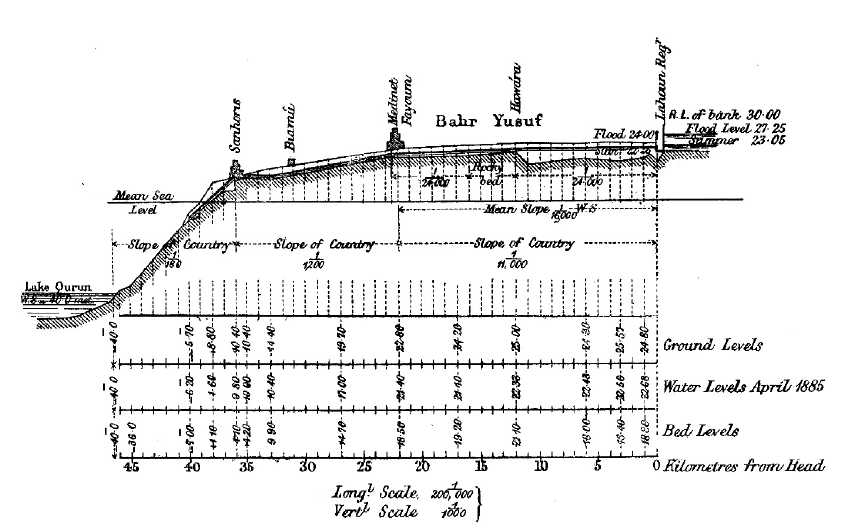
Terain cross profil of Al-Lahun to Birkat Qarun water chanel; leveling year 1913

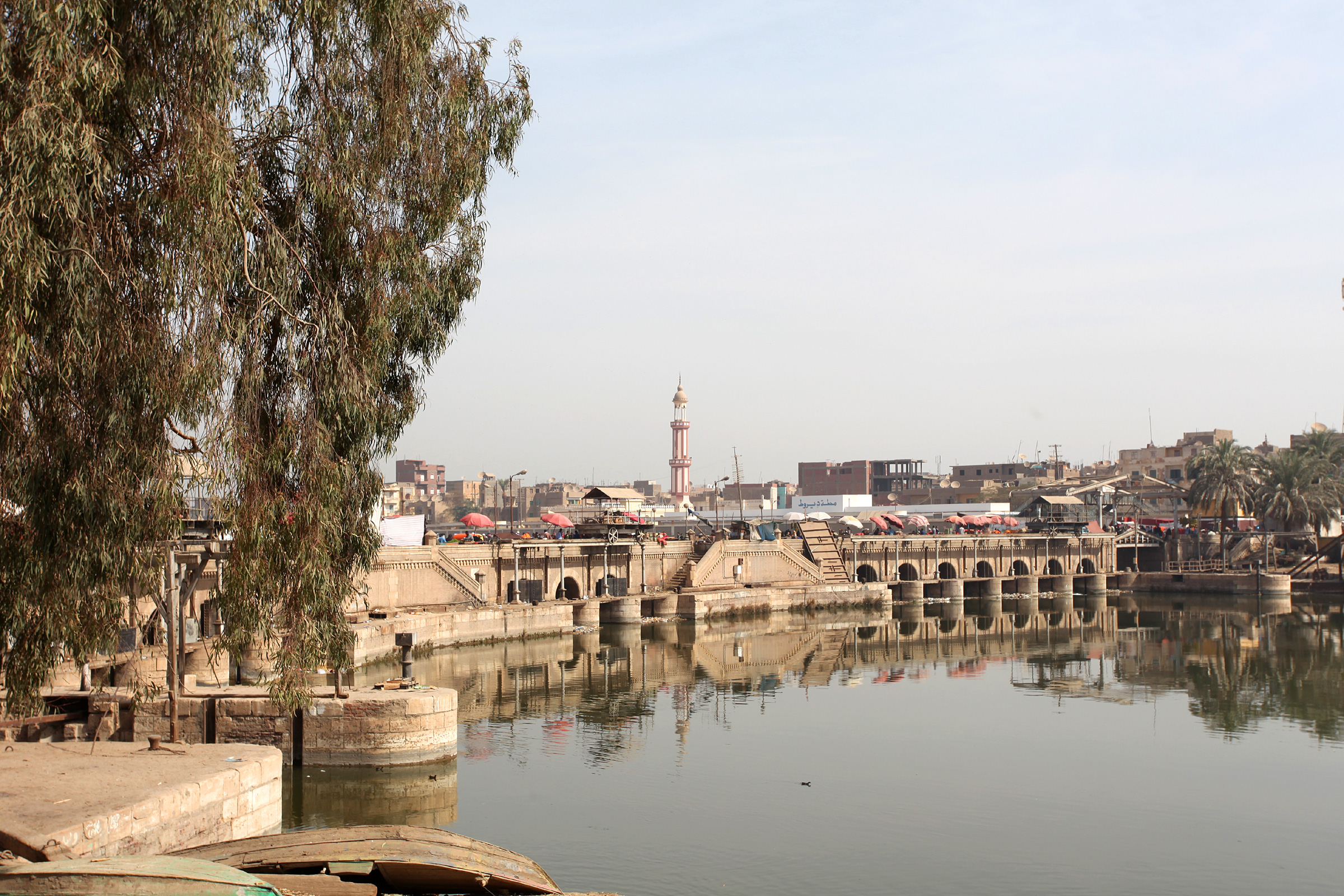
Dam at Dairut dividing Ibrahimiya Canal into Bahr Yousef Canal

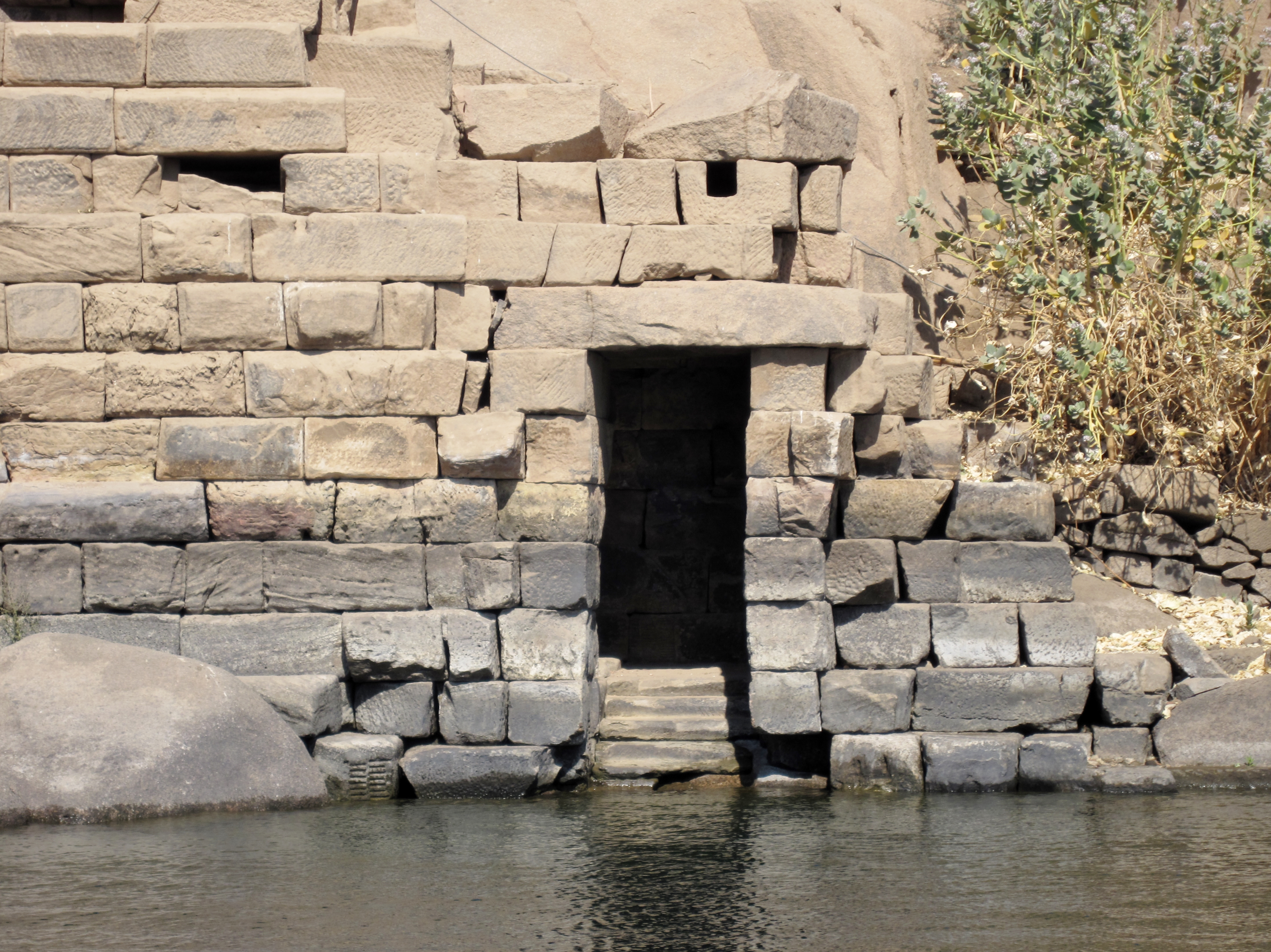
Nilometer on the southeastern side of Elephantine Island in Aswan

== Sources ==
- "Fayum Project". trismegistos.org. University of Leuven.
- Chanson, Hubert (1999). "Study of the Moeris reservoir, the Ha-Uar Dam and the canal connecting the Nile River and Lake Moeris". The Hydraulics of Open Channel Flow: An introduction (textbook) (1st ed.). Butterworth-Heinemann / Elsevier Science, Technology, & Business. Major Problem 2. Archived from the original on 2008-01-13 – via bh.com.
