= Shemanefer =

Ancient Egyptian deity

- Various forms of Shemanefer all with crocadile heads but wearing different crowns.
Name in hieroglyphs
S M D54 O29 nfr I3
- Major cult center: Esna
- Symbol: Crocodile

Genealogy
- Parents: Neith
- Siblings: (in some myths) Sobek and Tutu

Shemanefer (also represented in Greek as Samanouphis) was a crocodile god worshipped in Esna in the Greco-Roman period of Ancient Egypt. He had an ambiguous identity, being identified with, or sometimes considered the brother of, Sobek or Tutu. Furthermore, Thomas Gamelin observes that the exact nature of his identification was often based on the crown he was wearing: he functioned similarly to Sobek-Heru with the hemhem crown, Sobek-Geb with the tjeni crown, and Sobek-Ra with the solar disc. In his solar form, he also took on aspects of Osiris.
