= Nehebkau =

Ancient Egyptian deity

- Member of the Assessors of Maat
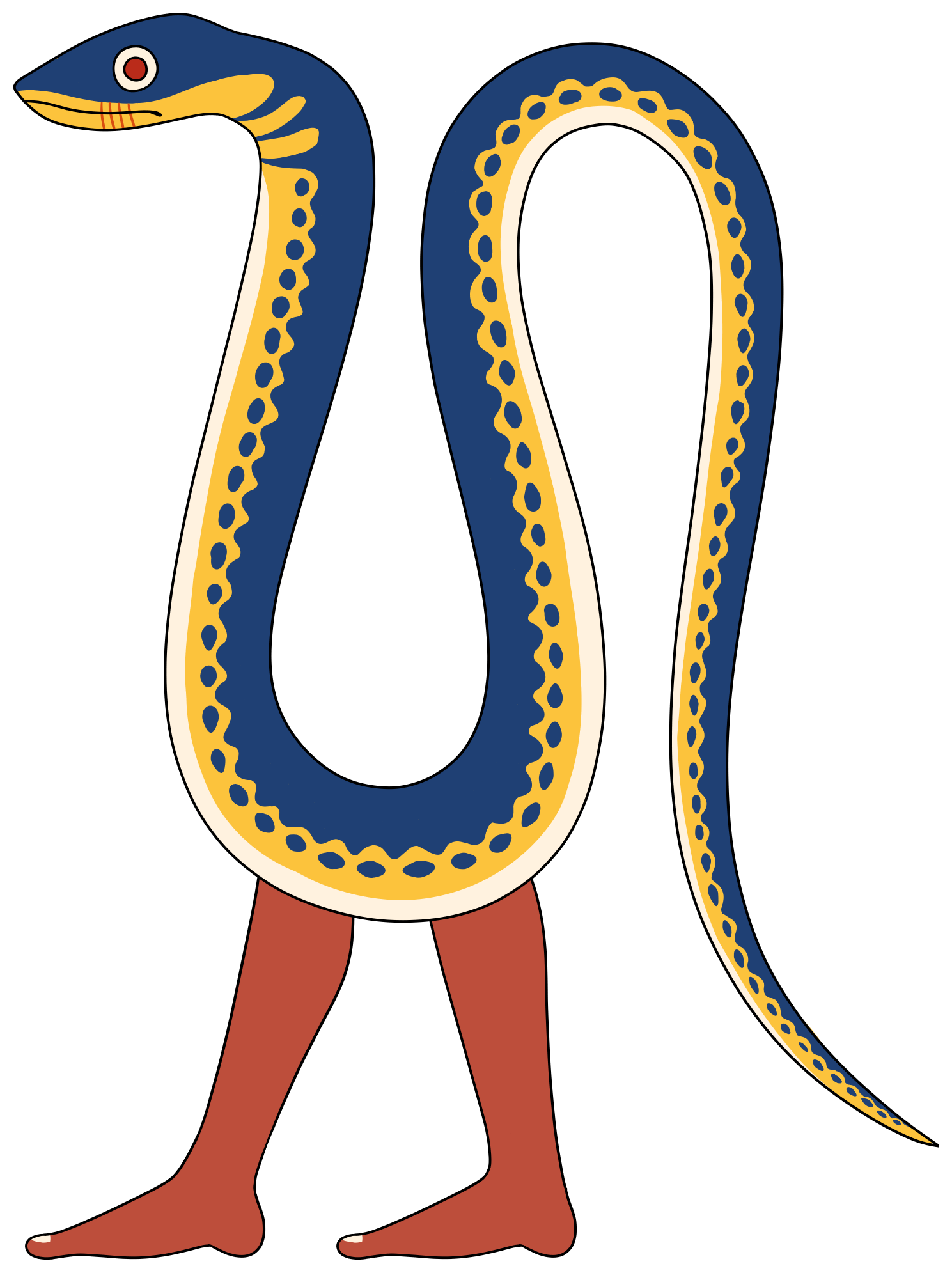
- Illustration of Nehebkau based on depictions in papyri/papyrus
- Other names: Nehebu-Kau
Name in hieroglyphs
G21 V28 b Z9 D28 Z2 D30 or n V28 G21 b w D28 D28 D28
- Venerated in: Middle Kingdom and New Kingdom
- Abode: Heliopolis
- Gender: Male
- Parents: Serket or Geb and Renenutet
- Consort: Nehmetawy

Nehebkau or Nehebu-Kau (Ancient Egyptian: nḥb-kꜣ-w; Coptic pronunciation: [nuhbkʰoʔ]) was the primordial snake god in ancient Egyptian mythology. Although originally considered an evil spirit, he later functions as a funerary god associated with the afterlife. As one of the forty-two assessors of Ma'at, Nehebkau was believed to judge the deceased after death and provide their souls with ka – the part of the soul that distinguished the living from the dead.

Nehebkau was ultimately considered a powerful, benevolent and protective deity. In late mythology, he is described as a companion of the sun god Ra and an attendant of the deceased King. As he is so closely associated with the sun god, his name was evoked in magical spells for protection. His festival was widely celebrated throughout the Middle and New Kingdoms.

== Name ==
Nehebkau's name – also spelled Neheb-Kau (nḥb-kꜣ.w) – has been translated in many ways by Egyptologists. These translations include: "that which gives Ka"; "he who harnesses the spirits"; the "overturner of doubles"; "collector of souls"; "provider of goods and foods" and "bestower of dignities".

== Mythology ==
Nehebkau with a falcon-head presents an Eye of Horus to Min. Based on depictions in various hypocephali.

Nehebkau is the "original snake" of Egyptian mythology, and was believed to be both an ancient and eternal god. Although he is occasionally represented as a son of Serket, Renenutet or Geb, he is sometimes believed to have simply "emerged from the earth". He was believed to have lived in the Great Temple of Heliopolis, which was also the centre of worship for Re and Atum.

Nehebkau is a considerably powerful deity, which contemporary Egyptologist and author Richard Wilkinson credits to his demonic origins and snake-like qualities. After he swallows seven cobras in a myth, Nehebkau cannot be harmed by any magic, fire or water. In an early myth, he demonstrates an ability to breathe fire. Nehebkau first appears in the Pyramid Texts, and he is described as an evil, long and winding serpent who devoured human souls in the afterlife. In this context, he is believed to be an enemy of the sun god, and Re is said to have built his sun boats to be able to be pushed by the wind in order to escape Nehebkau's many coils.

Nehebkau was later honoured among other dangerous gods as one of the 42 judges in the Court of Maat, judging the innocence of deceased souls. Additionally, orientalist Professor Wilhelm Max Muller describes Nehebkau to have personally guarded the gates of the underworld.

As a snake god, Nehebkau was also considered a dangerous, furious and fearsome demon.

In the Coffin Texts, however, the ancient god Atum places his fingernail against a nerve in Nehebkau's spine, calming his chaotic and fearsome nature.

Throughout and following the Coffin Texts, Nehebkau is considered a benevolent and helpful deity who may be befriended by gods and men and enlisted into service. After this transformation, he appears as a servant and partner to the sun god Re, and is said to provide food and assistance to the deceased King in the afterlife. In this position, he became increasingly powerful and important, eventually assuming Re's role as a King of The Sky.

It is in this peaceful form that he mostly appears in Egyptian mythologies, and he was often evoked as a protective god in religious rituals, amulets and spells.

== Roles ==
=== Funerary God ===
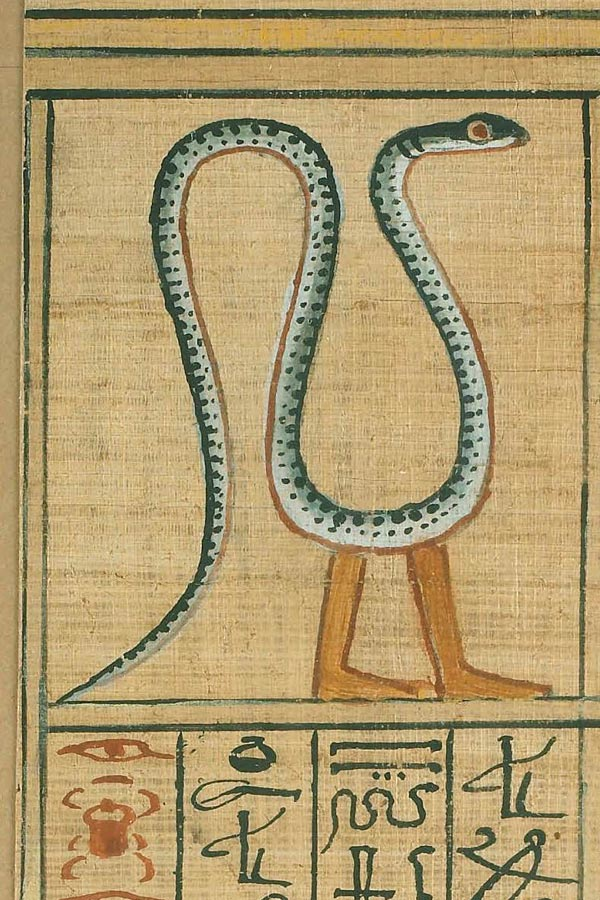
Although Nehebkau was sometimes depicted similarly, this image depicts not Nehebkau, but the spirit of the deceased having transformed into a Sa-Ta-snake in the underworld, in spell 87 from the Book of the Dead of Ani

As a funerary god and one of the forty-two judges in the Court of Maat, Nehebkau played a significant role in the Ancient Egyptian perception of the afterlife. As well as guarding the underworld, he was occasionally represented as a personal guard of Osiris.

When a deceased spirit enters the afterlife in Ancient Egyptian mythology, the most important stage is their trial in the Court of Maat, also known as the Law-Court of Osiris or the Dead Court. This tribunal consisted of forty-two fearsome deities who represented all possible types of evil, and to whom the deceased had to declare their innocence.

Nehebkau had a specific role in examining the individual's purity and sinlessness, and he was specifically responsible for protecting the neck and throat of the deceased.

Once the deceased is justified and found innocent by the Court, Nehebkau is believed to have absolved the soul of sin and provided the deceased with food and drink. He additionally nourishes the deceased with ka – the 'life force' of the individual - allowing their spirit to endure in the afterlife.

=== Attendant of Re ===
After he was subdued by Atum, Nehebkau was characterised as benevolent, beautiful and peaceful. It is in this state that he became the servant and partner of the sun god Re. In later myths, he assists Re in his moving of the morning boat through the sky to the east and throughout the flight of the day. In the Book of The Dead, this passage is described as making all people happy, filling hearts with "joy and justice".

Additionally, Nehebkau is said to have served the dead Kings in this period: providing food, transmitting messages and intervening with other deities on their behalf.

=== Successor of Re ===
Nehebkau eventually assumed Re's role in the afterlife: becoming "the King of Heaven and ruler of the Two Lands" and bestowing crowns, ka and other desirable qualities upon the spirits of the deceased. He acted as a mediator between the deceased and the gods, and was additionally responsible for assigning the dead their positions in the afterlife.

== Relationship to other gods ==
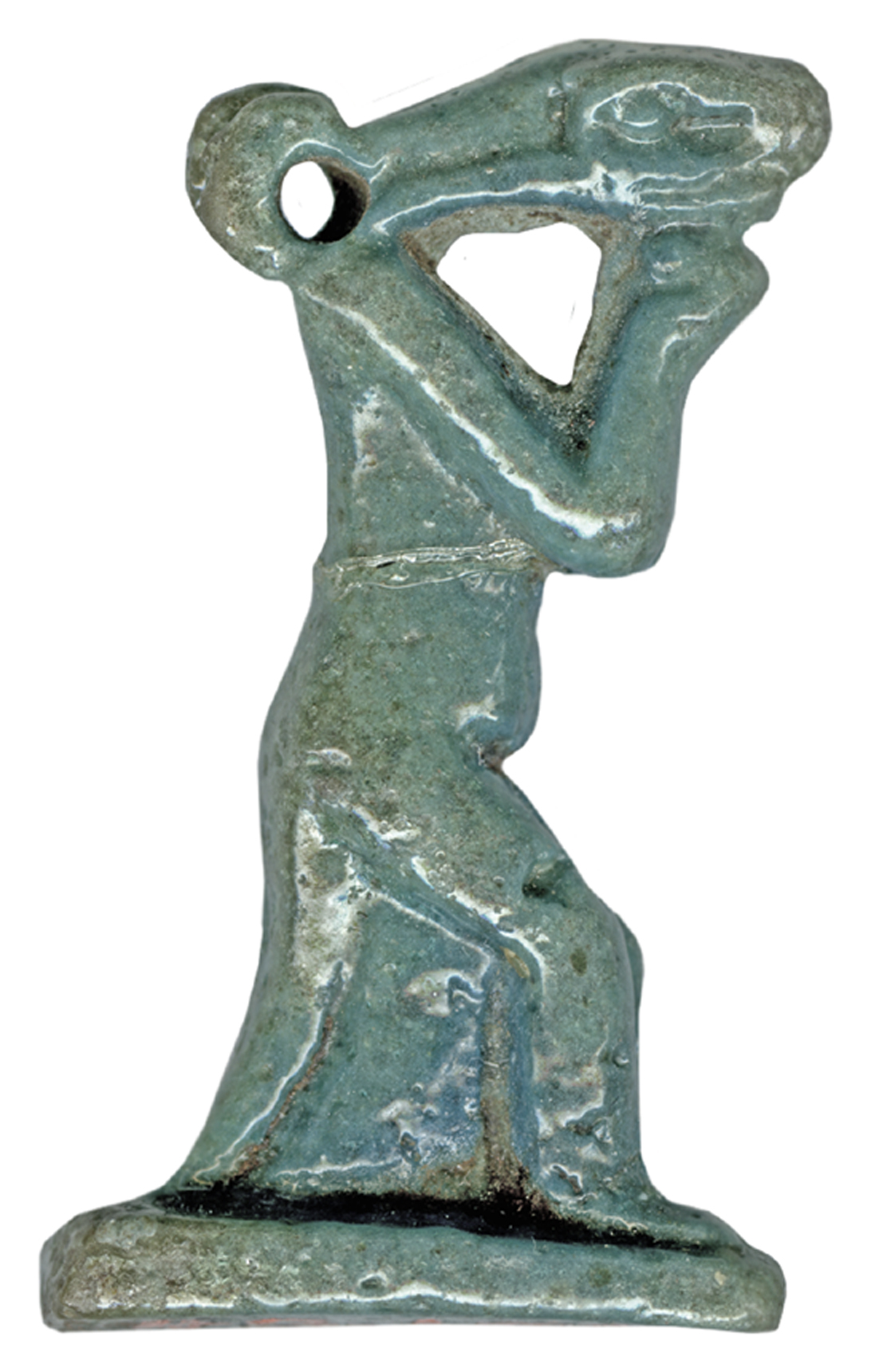
An Ancient Egyptian representation of Nehebkau, houses in the Walters Art Museum and produced in the Third Intermediate Period. This representation has a human body and serpent head and tail. The knees are flexed and the hands are at the mouth.

Nehebkau continuously appears alongside the sun god Re, as an assistant, companion and successor.

As an assessor of Maat in the Court of Osiris, he was also associated with Osiris himself: the god of the dead, fertility and the afterlife. Although not all of the 42 assessors have been identified by scholars, Wilkerson considers significant deities such as the ibis Thoth and crocodile Sobek to be included in the tribunal, and these gods can therefore be considered associates of Nehebkau.

As a snake deity, he was associated with and likely modelled after the great snake Apep — the enemy of Ra and embodiment of chaos in Egyptian myth.

Additionally, as a visiting god of Heliopolis and an ancient deity, Nehebkau was often associated with Atum: the creator god who calms his chaotic nature.

Nehebkau was represented as a consort of the minor goddess Nehmtaway, who is also a known partner of the wisdom god Thoth. She was depicted as a goddess holding an infant, with a distinguishing headdress shaped like a sistrum - an Ancient Egyptian musical instrument.

He sometimes appeared as a consort to the scorpion goddess Serket, who protected the deceased King and was often evoked to cure poison and scorpion stings. Some myths also describe Nehebkau as Serket's son.

Alternatively, he was believed to be the son of the earth god Geb. This is common with Egyptian snake gods and associated with the imagery of snakes crawling across the earth. When Geb is represented as his father, Nehebkau's mother is considered to be the harvest goddess Renenutet: the 'good snake' who ensured bountiful fields, harvests and kitchens for the living and nourished the kas of the dead.

The image of Nehebkau also appeared on depictions of the thrones of feline goddess Sekhmet and Bastet. Wilkerson theorises that this iconography would have likely symbolised his protection over them.

== Iconography ==
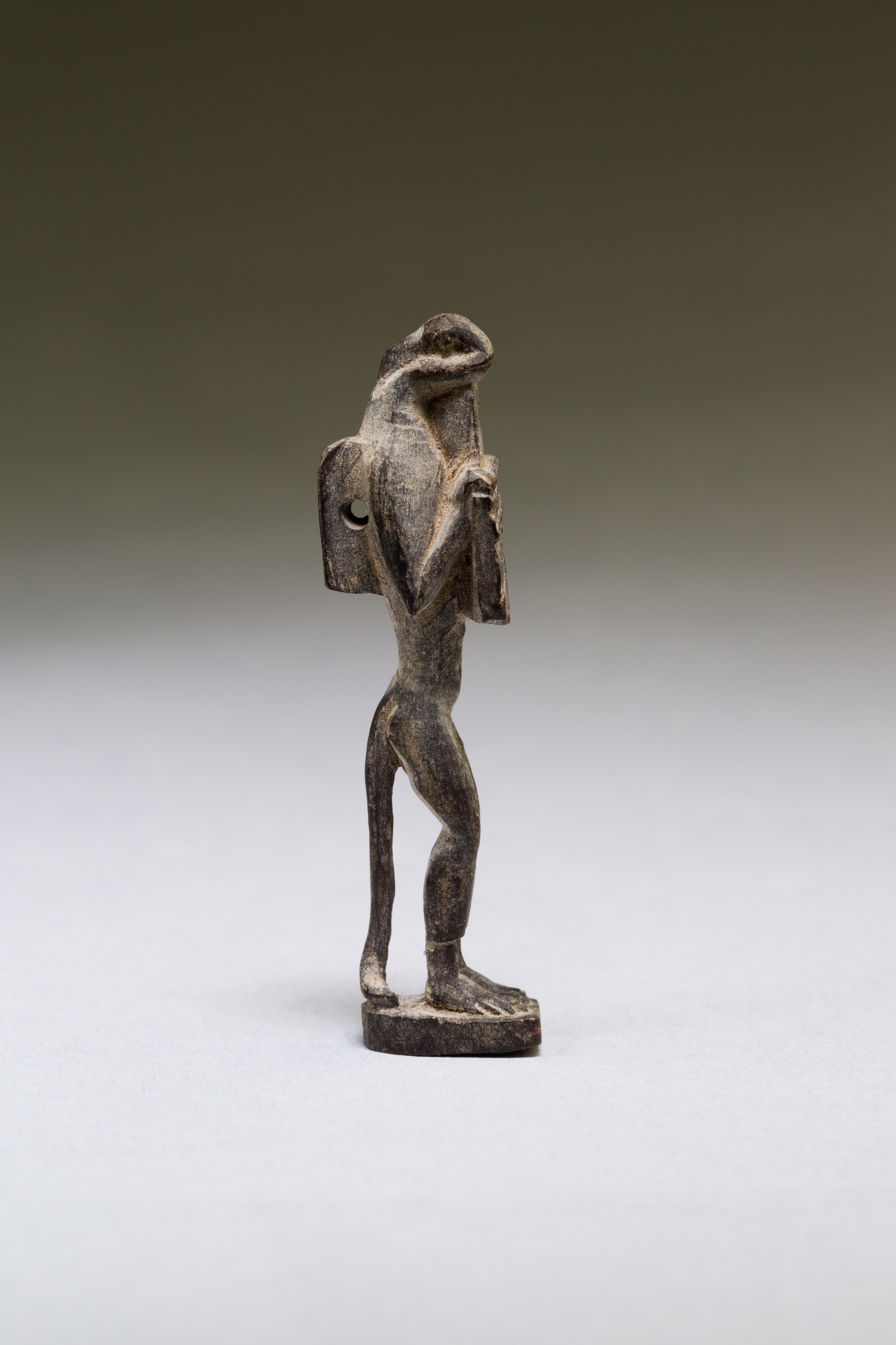
A wooden figure of Nehebkau from the Ptolemaic period housed in the Metropolitan Museum of Art. He appears with a human body and snake head and tail, holding a Wedjat eye as a symbol of protection.

Nehebkau is most often represented in Ancient Egyptian art, carvings and statues as an anthropomorphised snake: half human and half serpent. He is also commonly depicted as a falcon headed snake with human arms and legs and an erect penis, depicted as such in multiple hypocephali.

However, early texts and mythologies usually represented Nehebkau as a full serpent with a long body and multiple coils. It is in this form that often appears on the sides of divine thrones, likely in reference to his protective qualities and powerful nature.

In later periods, he appeared in a semi-anthropromophised form, as a man with the head and tail of a serpent or a serpent with human arms and legs. In this form he appears on amulets, small statues and plaques, with his arms "raised to the mouth to proffer small vessels for food or drink," reflecting his function in the afterlife.

Nehebkau was occasionally shown as having two heads on two separate necks, and a third head on his tail supported by the figure of a man. Egyptologist Magali Massiera suggests that the two heads could be a representation of his dual good and evil nature, as well as his ability to simultaneously attack from two directions at once. In one artifact from Heliopolis, he appears as an eight headed snake.

These detailed descriptions of his appearance were common for guardians of the underworld, and were done so Nehekbau could be recognised by the deceased. Occasionally, Nehebkau is represented with the features of other snake demons: such as multiple heads and wings.

== Worship ==
Although there was no specific priesthood associated with Nehebkau, scholars including Wilkinson consider it likely that he was widely worshipped in popular religion.

This worship was likely centred at his temple in Herakleopolis, although its exact location is rarely mentioned in sources. Nehebkau was also often associated with the Great Temple of Heliopolis, where he may have had a funerary chapel, as well as a statue that dates back to the reign of King Ramses II.

Nehebkau was also depicted in many amulets from the New Kingdom's third intermediate period and later. These amulets were often found in burials, which indicates a belief that Nehebkau would protect the deceased through their journey to the underworld. Kalloniatis also associates these amulets with Nehebkau's ability to sustain ka in spirits and nourish the deceased with food and drink in the afterlife.

His image also appears on amulets designed to protect against poison, snake-bites and scorpion venom.

=== Magic and Spells ===
Anti-snake spells are incredibly common in Egyptian texts, appearing in the Pyramid Texts, Coffin Texts and the Book of the Dead, alongside other spells designed to repel dangerous animals. Many magical objects are inscribed with scenes of benevolent deities protecting humanity from snakes.

After becoming associated with Ra, Nehebkau's name was often evoked in magical spells to function as a magical protector. His image was depicted as a protective deity on some ivory wands.

== Festivals ==
Nehebkau's festival was recorded as occurring thirty-two times in the New Kingdom, but is known to have been celebrated since at least the Middle Kingdom.

The exact date of the festival is contested by scholars: it may have been celebrated nine days after the festival of ploughing the earth, on the first day of the first month of the winter season or alternatively during the coronation of the King during the Ramesside period.

Individuals would often celebrate this festival by eating hsjitt plants and cakes made of khersait plants. The festival is believed by researcher Sharon LaBorde to have been a feast celebrating redemption and rebirth; potentially associated with the lion goddess Sekhmet.
