= Assessors of Maat =

42 minor ancient Egyptian deities

- the 42 Judges of Maat seated, based on image from Papyrus of Ani
- Abode: Duat

The Assessors of Maat were 42 minor ancient Egyptian deities of the Maat charged with judging the souls of the dead in the afterlife by joining the judgment of Osiris in the Weighing of the Heart.

== Description ==
=== Negative Confessions and psychostasia ===
Chapter 125 of the Book of the Dead lists names and provenances (either geographical or atmospheric) of the Assessors of Maat. A declaration of innocence corresponds to each deity: it is pronounced by the dead himself, to avoid being damned for specific "sins" that each of the 42 Judges is in charge of punishing.

The deceased was accompanied in the presence of Osiris by the psychopomp god Anubis – where he would have declared that he was guilty of none of the "42 sins" against justice and truth by reciting a text known as "Negative confessions". The heart (ib / jb) of the deceased was then weighed on a two-plate scale: a plate for the heart, the other for the feather of Maat. Maat, in whose name the 42 judges who flanked Osiris acted, was the deification of truth, justice, rectitude, and order of the cosmos and was often symbolized by an ostrich feather (the hieroglyphic sign of her name). If the heart and the feather were equal, then the deities were convinced of the rectitude of the deceased, who could therefore access eternal life becoming mꜣꜥ-ḫrw (Egyptological pronunciation: Maa Kheru), which means "vindicated / justified", literally "true of voice" ("blessed" in a broad sense). But, if the heart was heavier than Maat's feather, then a terrifying monster named ꜥmmt "the Devourer" ("Ammit") devoured it by destroying the soul of the deceased.

The psychostasia episode is remarkable not only for its symbolic and even dramatic vivacity, but also because it is one of the few parts of the Book of the Dead with moral connotations. The judgment by Osiris and by the other 42 judicial deities, and the "Negative Confessions" themselves, depict the ethics and morality of the Egyptians. These 42 declarations of innocence were interpreted by some as possible historical precedents of the Ten Commandments: but, while the Ten Commandments of Judeo-Christian ethics consist of norms attributed to a divine revelation, the "Negative confessions" seem rather as divine transpositions (each corresponding to one of the 42 judging deities) of daily morality.

=== List of names, provenances and tasks (Wilkinson et al) ===
The American egyptologist Richard Herbert Wilkinson thus inventoried, in his The Complete Gods and Goddesses of Ancient Egypt (2003), the 42 Assessors of Maat: However, other translations of the Papyrus of Ani give different impressions of their tasks and duties, included in the fourth columns.

| | Name of the deity | Identified with | Sin (Wilkinson) | Papyrus of Ani |
|---|---|---|---|---|
| 1 | Usekh-nemmt "Far-Strider" | Heliopolis | Falsehood | Hail, Usekh-nemmt, who comest forth from Anu, I have not committed sin. |
| 2 | Hept-khet "Fire-Embracer" | Kheraha (Old Cairo?) | Robbery | Hail, Hept-khet, who comest forth from Kher-aha, I have not committed robbery with violence. |
| 3 | Fenti "Nosey One" | Hermopolis | Rapaciousness | Hail, Fenti, who comest forth from Khemenu, I have not stolen. |
| 4 | Am-khaibit "Swallower of Shades" | "The Cavern" | Murder | Hail, Am-khaibit, who comest forth from Qernet, I have not slain men and women. |
| 5 | Neha-her "Dangerous One" | Rosetau (Giza Plateau) | Stealing | Hail, Neha-her, who comest forth from Rasta, I have not stolen grain. |
| 6 | Ruruti "Double Lion" | "The sky" | Destruction of food | Hail, Ruruti, who comest forth from Heaven, I have not purloined offerings. |
| 7 | Arfi-em-khet "Fiery Eyes" | Letopolis | Crookedness | Hail, Arfi-em-khet, who comest forth from Suat, I have not stolen the property of God. |
| 8 | Neba "Flame" | "Came forth backwards" | Stealing offerings | Hail, Neba, who comest and goest, I have not uttered lies. |
| 9 | Set-qesu "Bone Breaker" | Heracleopolis | Lying | Hail, Set-qesu, who comest forth from Hensu, I have not carried away food. |
| 10 | Utu-nesert "Green of Flame" | Memphis | Taking food | Hail, Utu-nesert, who comest forth from Het-ka-Ptah, I have not uttered curses. |
| 11 | Qerrti "You of the Cavern" | "The West" | Sullenness | Hail, Qerrti, who comest forth from Amentet, I have not committed adultery. |
| 12 | Kenemti "White of Teeth" | Faiyum | Transgression | Hail, Kenemti, who comest forth from Kenmet, I have not blasphemed. (#27 in Papyrus source) |
| 13 | Hetch-abhu/ Shezmu "House of Nature" | "The shambles" | Killing a sacred bull | Hail, Basti, who comest forth from Bast, I have not eaten the heart. |
| 14 | Ta-retiu "Eater of Entrails" | "House of Thirty" | Perjury | Hail, Ta-retiu, who comest forth from the night, I have not attacked any man. |
| 15 | Unem-snef "Lord of Truth" | Maaty | Stealing bread | Hail, Unem-snef, who comest forth from the execution chamber, I am not a man of deceit. |
| 16 | Unem-besek "Wanderer" | Bubastis | Eavesdropping | Hail, Unem-besek, who comest forth from Mabit, I have not stolen cultivated land. |
| 17 | Neb-Maat "Pale One" | Heliopolis | Babbling | Hail, Neb-Maat, who comest forth from Maati, I have not been an eavesdropper. |
| 18 | Tenemiu "Doubly Evil" | Andjet | Disputing | Hail, Tenemiu, who comest forth from Bast, I have not slandered anyone. |
| 19 | Sertiu "Wememty-Snake" | "Place of execution" | Adultery | Hail, Sertiu, who comest forth from Anu, I have not been angry without just cause. |
| 20 | Tutu "See Whom You Bring" | "House of Min" | Misbehavior | Hail, Tutu, who comest forth from Ati, I have not debauched the wife of any man. |
| 21 | Uamenti "Over the Old One" | Imau | Terrorizing | Hail, Uamenti, who comest forth from the Khebt chamber, I have not debauched the wives of other men. |
| 22 | Maa-antuf "Demolisher" | Xois | Transgressing | Hail, Maa-antuf, who comest forth from Per-Menu, I have not polluted myself. |
| 23 | Her-uru "Disturber" | Weryt | Being hot-tempered | Hail, Her-uru, who comest forth from Nehatu, I have terrorized none. |
| 24 | Khemiu "Youth" | Heliopolitan nome | Unhearing of truth | Hail, Khemiu, who comest forth from Kaui, I have not transgressed the law. |
| 25 | Shet-kheru "Foreteller" | Wenes | Making disturbance | Hail, Shet-kheru, who comest forth from Urit, I have not been angry. |
| 26 | Nebheru "You of the Altar" | "the secret place" | Hoodwinking | Hail, Nekhenu, who comest forth from Heqat, I have not shut my ears to the words of truth. |
| 27 | Hraf-haf "Face Behind Him" | "Cavern of wrong" | copulating with a boy | Hail, Hraf-haf, who comest forth from thy cavern, I have made none to weep. (#12 in Papyrus source) |
| 28 | An-hetep-f "Hot-Foot" | "The dusk" | Neglect | Hail, An-hetep-f, who comest forth from Sau, I am not a man of violence. |
| 29 | Sera-kheru "You of the Darkness" | "The darkness" | Quarrelling | Hail, Sera-kheru, who comest forth from Unaset, I have not been a stirrer up of strife. |
| 30 | Neb-heru "Bringer of Your Offerings" | Sais | Unduly active | Hail, Neb-heru, who comest forth from Netchfet, I have not acted with undue haste. |
| 31 | Sekhriu "Owner of Faces" | Nedjefet (13th / 14th Upper Egyptian nome) | Impatience | Hail, Sekhriu, who comest forth from Uten, I have not pried into other's matters. |
| 32 | Neb-abui "Accuser" | Wetjenet (in Punt) | damaging a god's image | Hail, Neb-abui, who comest forth from Sauti, I have not multiplied my words in speaking. |
| 33 | "Owner of Horns" | Asyut | Volubility of speech | Hail, Tcheser-tep, who comest forth from the shrine, I have not carried away the khenfu cakes from the spirits of the dead. (#40 in Papyrus source) |
| 34 | Nefertem | Memphis | Wrongdoing, beholding evil | Hail, Nefer-Tem, who comest forth from Het-ka-Ptah, I have wronged none, I have done no evil. (#33 in Papyrus source) |
| 35 | Temsep/Tem-Sepu | Busiris | Conjuration against the king | Hail, Tem-Sepu, who comest forth from Tetu, I have not worked witchcraft against the king. (#34 in Papyrus source) |
| 36 | Ari-em-ab-f "You Who Acted Willfully" | Tjebu | Stopping water flow (Wilkinson says "wading in water") | Hail, Ari-em-ab-f, who comest forth from Tebu, I have never stopped the flow of water of a neighbor. (#35 in Papyrus source) |
| 37 | Ahi "Water-Smiter" | "The abyss" | Being loud voiced | Hail, Ahi, who comest forth from Nu, I have never raised my voice. (#36 in Papyrus source) |
| 38 | Uatch-rekhit "Commander of Mankind" | "Your house" | Reviling God | Hail, Uatch-rekhit, who comest forth from Sau, I have not cursed God. (#37 in Papyrus source) |
| 39 | Nehebkau | The Harpoon Nome (7th / 8th Lower Egyptian nome) | Arrogance (Wilkinson says "doing...?") | Hail, Neheb-ka, who comest forth from thy cavern, I have not acted with arrogance. (#38 in Papyrus source) |
| 40 | Neheb-nefert Bestower of Powers" | "The city" | Making distinctions For self | Hail, Neheb-nefert, who comest forth from thy cavern, I have not stolen the bread of the gods. (#39 in Papyrus source) |
| 41 | Hetch-abhu "Serpent With Raised Head" | "The cavern" | dishonest wealth | Hail, Hetch-abhu, who comest forth from Ta-she, I have not slain the cattle belonging to the god. (#42 in Papyrus source) |
| 42 | Neb-abui "Serpent Who Brings and Gives" | "The silent land" | Blasphemy | Hail, An-af, who comest forth from Maati, I have not snatched away the bread of the child, nor treated with contempt the god of my city. (#41 in Papyrus source) |

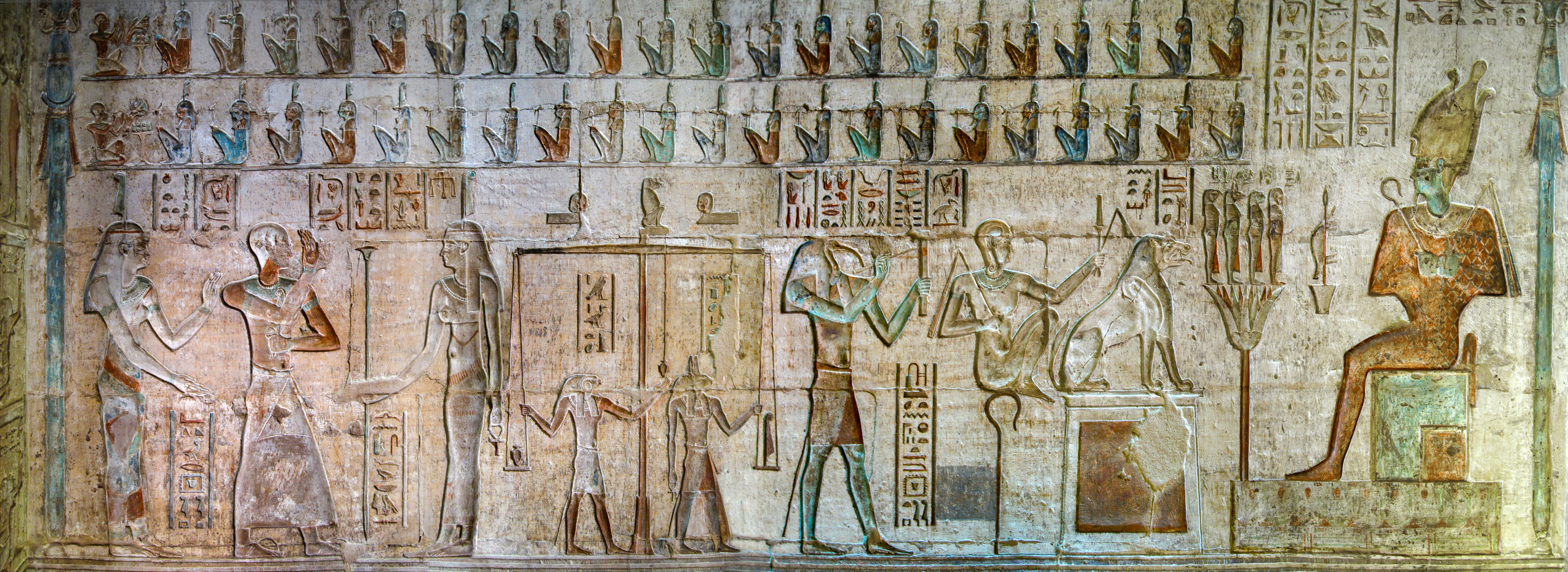
All 42 Judges of Maat are depicted above this scene of psychostasia from the Temple of Hathor at Deir el-Medina. Each of them has on his head the ostrich feather of their mistress Maat.
