= Book of the Faiyum =

Ancient Egyptian text about the mythology of the Faiyum region

Sobek is a central figure in the Book of Faiyum.

The Book of the Faiyum is an ancient Egyptian "local monograph" celebrating the Faiyum region of Egypt and its patron deity, the crocodile god Sobek. It has also been classified generically as a "cult topographical priestly manual." The text is known from multiple sources dating to Ptolemaic and Roman Egypt (332 BCE – 359 CE). It primarily functioned as a mythologized map of the Faiyum.

== Known copies ==
The Book of the Faiyum exists in a variety of forms. The book enjoyed a vast amount of popularity in Roman Egypt and many fragments of the text have been found. These include both hieroglyphic and hieratic (a cursive ancient Egyptian script) versions of the text. Of the hieroglyphic versions, there are both illustrated and un-illustrated forms. Some of the hieratic copies contain demotic notations, but no purely demotic form of the text has been found.

Most primary sources for the text are un-illustrated hieratic copies on papyri. However, as aforementioned, other sources are available. The text is partially copied in hieroglyphs on the walls of the Temple of Kom Ombo, located in Upper Egypt, outside of the Faiyum. The sarcophagus of Ankhrui from the Faiyum locality of Hawara also contains hieroglyphic excerpts and copied illustrations from the text.

Egyptologist Horst Beinlich published a full and illustrated edition of the hieroglyphic versions of the Book of the Faiyum in 1991, thus paving the road for further scholarly investigation of the text. This publication is entitled Das Buch vom Fayum: zum religiösen Eigenverständnis einer ägyptischen Landschaft.

=== The Boulaq/Hood/Amherst Papyrus ===
The Boulaq/Hood/Amherst papyrus is named for the three modern collectors who once held its pieces after its division in 1859. This is the best-known version of the text, as it is renowned for its exquisite illustrations and fine state of preservation. The complete text measures 7 m in length.

Two major parts of this papyrus are in American museum collections – the Morgan Library & Museum and the Walters Art Museum – and were reunited in a traveling exhibition that opened at the Walters Art Museum in Baltimore on October 6, 2013. The exhibition was entitled Egypt’s Mysterious Book of the Faiyum.

== Content and function ==
The book, though a product of the Roman Period of Egyptian history, is rooted in the established canon of Egyptian religious thought. Influences from and references to religious texts that were common in pharaonic Egypt are seen throughout the entirety of the Book of the Faiyum, standing as a testament to the longevity of Egyptian religion. Among these references to earlier doctrine is an outline of the basic journey of the sun god, Re, which is detailed in older texts, like the New Kingdom Amduat funerary texts. Re was thought to grow old in the course of each day and then rejuvenate during the night so he would be reborn again at sunrise. This theme is explored extensively in the Book of the Faiyum, as Sobek is portrayed as a manifestation of Re. However, deviating from New Kingdom traditions, Sobek-Re's journey through the day concludes not with his descent into the Duat (afterworld), but rather, Lake Moeris, the lake that is central to the Faiyum oasis. It is through the lake, not the underworld, that Sobek-Re makes his nightly journey.

The book also includes references to various Egyptian creation myths. These theologies were held simultaneously – not competitively – in ancient Egypt, so it is not unusual for a text to reference more than one creation myth. The Ogdoad myth of Hermopolis is illustrated in the Book of the Faiyum with detailed drawings of the eight frog- and snake-headed primeval deities around which the myth centers. The creation story of Heliopolis is also illustrated, as Nut, the sky-goddess, is shown in her celestial form as a cow. She is depicted being held up by the sun god, just as Shu, the god of the air, holds her up in the Heliopolitan myth.

This highly esoteric text was likely the product of a House of Life, or temple scriptorium. It seems that the text was meant as a high form of scholarly religious doctrine. Some scholars have suggested that the text was intended for Sobek himself, as no human could unroll the entire papyrus to see and interpret the fully illustrated map, perhaps suggesting that it was not meant for human eyes at all, but rather those of the divine. Other scholars have suggested that the frequency with which the document was copied, coupled with its complexity, could likely make it a text that was used to test the prowess of young scribes completing their training in the House of Life.

=== As a map ===
The Book of the Faiyum also doubles as a mythologized map of the Faiyum region. It contains extensive lists of deities directly paired with their cult places. The reader is ultimately led through the text with a narrative of localities, even though few of them are physically depicted. Rather, these Faiyum-specific localities and the cosmic localities that are referenced in the text are often depicted with encoded iconography.

The perspective of Sobek is assumed by the reader in this narrative. First, the waterway which connects the Nile and the Faiyum, the Bahr Yusuf, is depicted in the form of the goddess Mehet-Weret, “the great flood.” Then the inundated lands surrounding the lake are depicted, followed by the lake itself. Sobek's cult center, which the Greeks called Crocodilopolis (ancient Egyptian "Shedyet"), is rendered next. Then a less significant cult center, Ro-sehwy, is shown. Finally, the last and perhaps least significant cult center is depicted, being that of Sobek's divine mother, Neith. A depiction of primeval gods and forces situates the Faiyum as a center of cosmic importance before the text concludes with another depiction of the Faiyum's central lake, Lake Moeris.

== Bibliography ==
- Allen, James P. Genesis in Egypt : the philosophy of ancient Egyptian creation accounts. New Haven: Yale Egyptological Seminar, 1988.
- Beinlich, Horst. Das Buch vom Fayum : zum religiösen Eigenverständnis einer ägyptischen Landschaft. Wiesbaden: Harrassowitz, 1991.
- Hornung, Erik. The Ancient Egyptian Books of the Afterlife. Ithaca: Cornell University Press, 1999.
- Klotz, David. “Egyptian Hieroglyphs.” In The Oxford Handbook of Roman Egypt, edited by Christina Riggs, 563 – 580. Oxford: Oxford University Press, 2012.
- O’Connor, David. “From Topography to Cosmos: Ancient Egypt’s Multiple Maps.” In Ancient Perspectives: Maps and Their Place in Mesopotamia, Egypt, Greece, and Rome, edited by Richard J.A. Talbert, 47 – 79. Chicago: University of Chicago Press, 2012.
- Tait, John. “The ‘Book of the Fayum’: Mystery in a Known Landscape.” In Mysterious Lands, edited by David O’Connor and Stephen Quirke, 183 – 202. Portland: Cavendish Publishing, 2003.
