= Serket =

Ancient Egyptian deity

- The Egyptian goddess Serket is often depicted as a woman with a scorpion gracing her crown. She holds the ankh, the symbol of life, in one hand and a was-sceptre, representing power, in the other.
Name in hieroglyphs
z r q t B1orz r q t L7
- Symbol: Scorpion

Genealogy
- Parents: Set, or Khnum and Neith
- Siblings: Apep (in some myths), Sobek (in some myths)
- Consort: Horus the Younger or Horus the Elder
- Offspring: Nehebkau (in some myths)

Serket (/ˈsɜːrkɛt/; Ancient Egyptian: srqt) is the goddess of protection against the venomous stings and bites of scorpions in Egyptian mythology. She was primarily worshiped in Lower Egypt during the Predynastic Period (c. 6000 – c. 3150 BCE). Serket is often depicted as a woman whose head is surmounted by a scorpion with its tail ready to sting, an ankh in one hand, and a was-sceptre in her other. Her name, also rendered as Serqet, Selkis, or Selket, is a shortened version of 'Serket hetyt' which means "she who causes the throat to breathe."

== Old Kingdom ==
=== Name and Roles ===
She is associated with healing, magic, and protection. Another interpretation of her name is, 'she who gives breath.' As many of the venomous creatures of Egypt could prove fatal, Serket was considered a protector of the dead, particularly being associated with venoms and fluids that cause stiffening.

It has been suggested that Serket's identification with a scorpion may be a misinterpretation of the phrase, 'she who gives breath'; it is possible that it could refer not to a scorpion, but rather a water scorpion (Nepidae). According to this hypothesis, the meaning behind Serket's name refers to the way water scorpions can breathe underwater. She was seen as one who could cure scorpion stings and the effects of other venoms such as snakebites. As such, Serket was often said to protect the deities from Apep, the great snake-demon of evil.

During the Old Kingdom she held a protective role around the throne of the king. However, her primary role was with the funerary cult. She was said to be the protector of the tents of embalmers and is one of the tutelary goddesses depicted on the canopic chest which contains four canopic jars. Qebehsenuef is said to guard the canopic jars and it is Serket's job to protect him along with Neith, Isis, and Nephthys. This role also coined her the title of 'Mistress of the beautiful house,' referring to the embalming pavilion.

Eventually, Serket began to be identified with Isis, sharing imagery and parentage, until finally, Serket was said to be merely an aspect of Isis, whose cult had become dominant.

== Middle Kingdom ==
During the Middle Kingdom, Egyptian myth says that Serket's help is required in the Underworld where according to the Book of the Two Ways she guards a twist in the pathway. She is also given credit for binding and containing the snake deity, Apophis (or Apep).

== New Kingdom ==
Serket was thought to be one of the mother goddesses and was given the title, 'Serket the great, the divine mother.' According to history of the Near East, the scorpion was often seen as a symbol of motherhood. As early as the Old Kingdom, Serket is said to have nursed the king. In the New Kingdom records of the birth of Amenophis III (or Amenhotep III) in the Luxor Temple, and in the mortuary temple of Hatshepsut, Serket is seen with Neith assisting the god Amun and the queen in the marriage bed. She has also appeared with Nephthys in the myth of the birth of Horus where the two goddesses assisted Isis in protecting the infant god from the bites or stings of deadly animals. In the same myth, Isis and her unborn child are protected by seven scorpions said to be emanations of Serket.

== Dedications and rituals ==
The cult of Serket is known to have existed from at least the First Dynasty, and is attested on a funerary stela from Saqqara. The majority of her worship was seen during the Old Kingdom. She is not known to have had any temples erected in her honor, yet she was an important goddess to the kings of the Predynastic Period, particularly Scorpion I and Scorpion II, for her protection against the deadly, venomous animals of Lower Egypt.

In January 2025, a group of French-Swiss archaeologists discovered the tomb of the chief palace physician in Saqqara, named Tetinebefou. In his temple there is reference to the goddess Serket in that Tetinebefou was said to be the 'director of medicinal plants and conjurer of the goddess Serket.' Aside from this discovery, and although Serket is said to have powers that can be utilized by the living for healing venomous bites, she is rarely included in spells concerning scorpion stings.

== Family ==
Little is known of her genealogy, but she is sometimes credited as the daughter of Neith and Khnum, making her a sister to Sobek and Apep.

Some myths depict her as the mother of Nehebu-Kau.

== Gallery ==
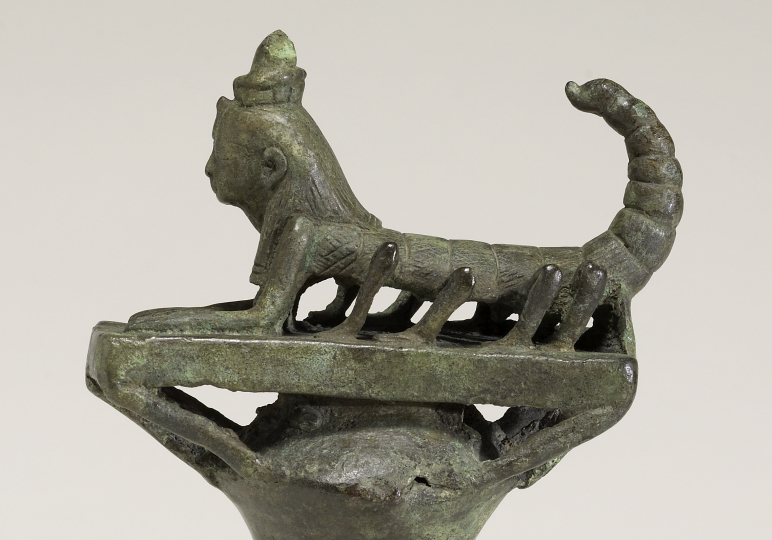
Late Period bronze figure of Isis-Serket

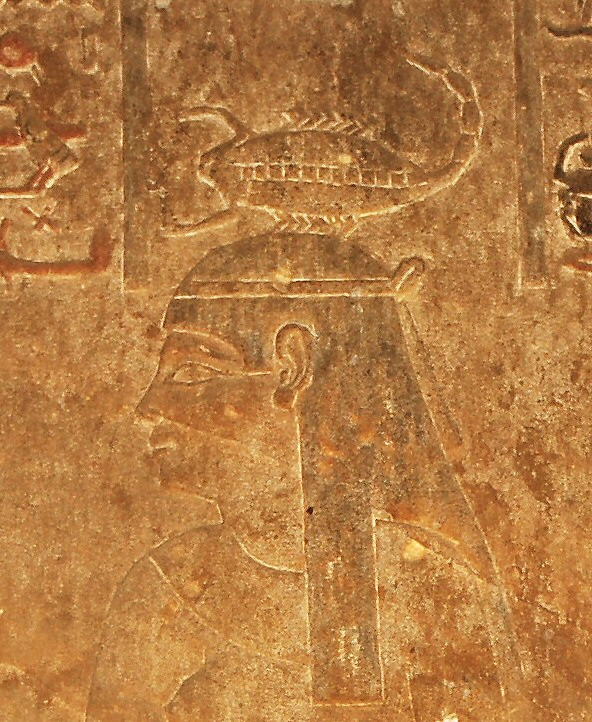
Serket and her scorpion, Edfu Temple

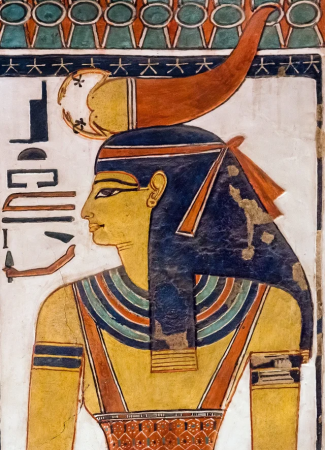
Serket as seen in the Tomb of Nefertari
