= Nehmetawy =

Ancient Egyptian deity

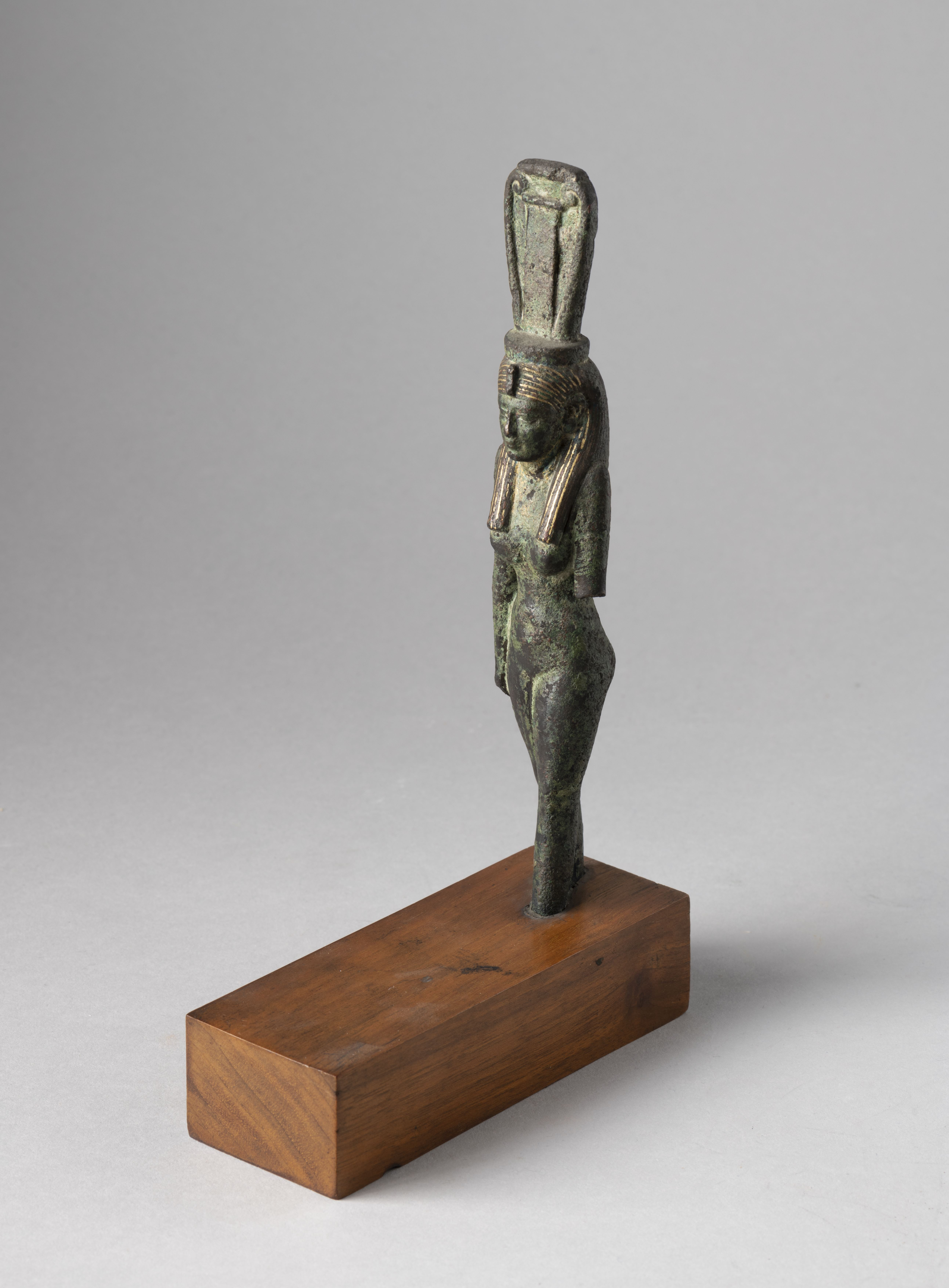
- Statuette of the goddess Nehemtawy, bronze. Museo Egizio, Turin, c. 406
Name in hieroglyphs
n N42 m t a wA i i I12
- Consort: Nehebkau or Thoth
- Offspring: Horus-Nefer

Nehmetawy (nḥm.t-ˁw3ỉ; "she who embraces those in need") is a goddess in the ancient Egyptian religion. She is not very widely known. Nehmetawy was the wife of snake god Nehebkau, or in other places of worship, like in Hermopolis, the wife of Thoth. A local form of the god Horus called Horus-nefer ("Horus, the good one)" might have been viewed as the son of Thoth and Nehmetawy. Her depictions are anthropomorph, with a sistrum-shaped headdress, often with a child in her lap.

== Tale of the returning goddess ==
In a tale from the Tebtunis Mythological Manual, the goddess Unut speared the earth god Geb for fornicating with Nehmetawy in Khemenu and Nehbet-anet in Dep. The two different locations where the goddesses were raped represent the two lands of ancient Egypt respectively. The tale might be connected with the myth of Shu separating Geb and Nut as punishment for the rape of his wife Tefnut.

The manual includes another myth about Nehmetawy, closely tied to the legend of "The returning Goddess." These myths center on a missing, raging goddess who must be convinced to return to Egypt by a male god. Numerous local versions of this myth exist, incorporating regional goddesses into the role of the returning goddess. In the Tebtunis manual, the goddess's exile and return are integral to a festival dedicated to the god Thoth, which also serves as the ritual framework for the composite myth of Geb’s crimes. In this context, the god Set appears both as Geb's son, attempting to reclaim his father's ill-gotten possessions, and as a manifestation of Geb himself. The goddess flees from Set to Naunet, where she is visited by Nephthys and Thoth. Together, they escort her back to the temple of Khemenu. There she meets the "Noble one", probably a reference to the local sun god Shepsy. Shepsy is associated with the Ogdoad, a group of eight primordial deities. This temple, called "The Temple of the Ogdoad" or "The Temple of the Golden One," depicted eight sistra symbolizing the goddess Hathor-Nehmetawy and her connection to the Ogdoad. The myth refers to Thoth and the goddess as siblings, reflecting a restored relationship akin to the union of Hathor-Tefnut and her brother Shu in other versions of the Return of the Goddess myth. Unlike other narratives where the goddess takes refuge in Nubia, here she retreats to Naunet, the primordial waters or inner sky, emphasizing the symbolic nature of mythic space.

Two demotic ostraca from the Ptolemaic period in Herakleopolis describe a festival characterized by drunkenness, indulgence, music, and sexual activity in the presence of the goddesses Nehmetawy and Ay. This festival alludes to the great Bastet festival in Bubastis. Ay embodies the wild, untamed version of the returning goddess, while Nehmetawy represents her peaceful counterpart after her return to Egypt, while In the Tebtunis manual, Unut represents the raging aspect of the returning goddess, while Nehmetawy is the pacified one.
