= Kellis =

Archaeological site in the Egyptian depression of el-Dakhla

Coordinates: 25°30′57″N 29°05′44″E

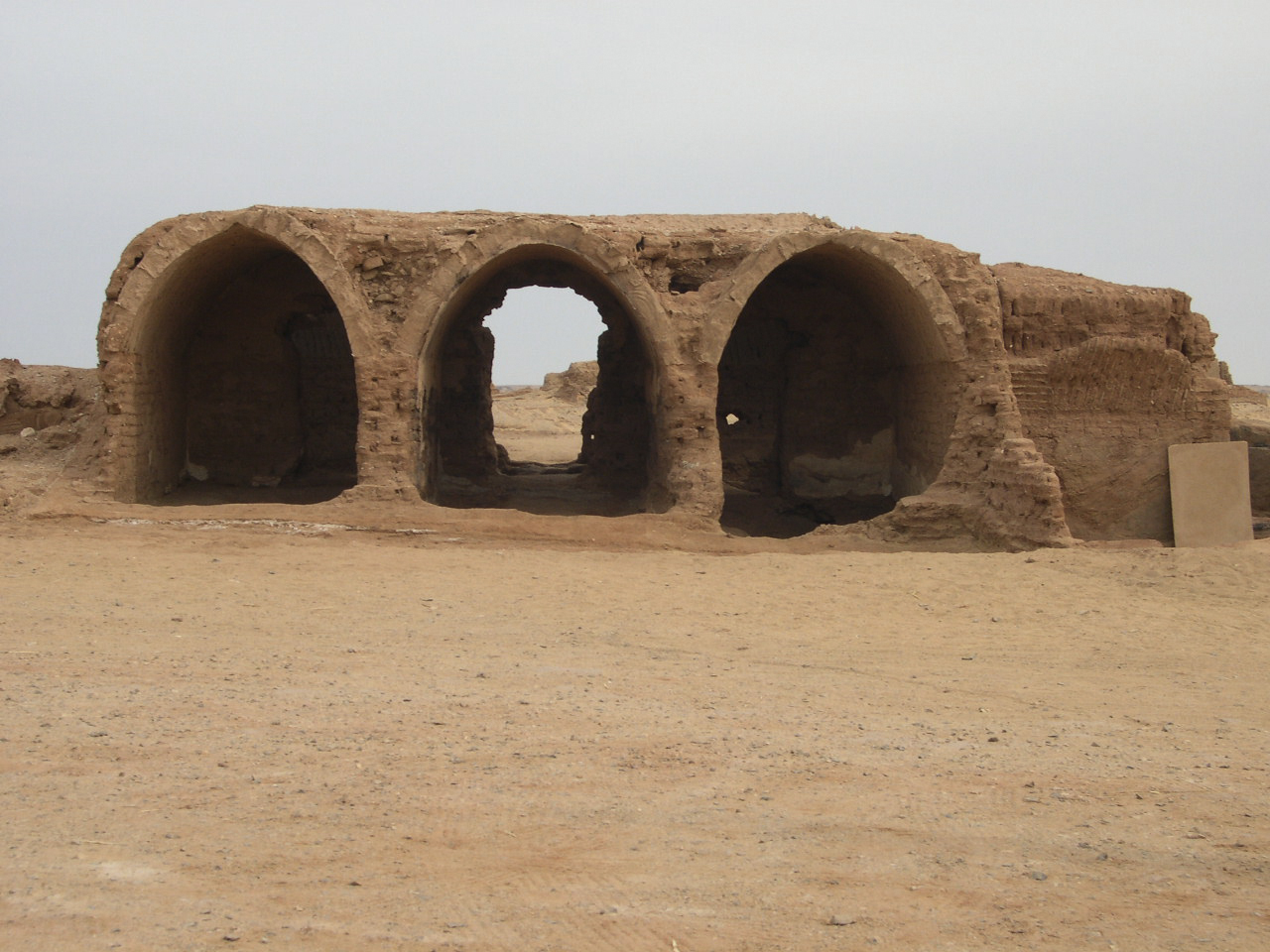
Ancient Kellis

Ancient Kellis, now known as Ismant el-Kharab ('Ismant the ruined' in Arabic), was a village in Upper Egypt during the Hellenistic, Roman, and Byzantine periods. It was located about 2.5 kilometers (1.6 mi) east-southeast of present-day Ismant in the Dakhleh Oasis, and about 11 kilometers (6.8 mi) northeast of Mut (more fully Mut el-Kharab), which is the capital of the oasis. In ancient times, Mut was called Mothis, and thus Kellis was in the Mothite nome.

== Structures ==
The village was 1,050 meters (3,440 ft) long and 650 meters (2,130 ft) wide, built almost entirely of mud brick on a low terrace with wadis to the southeast and northwest, and surrounded by fields. Small businesses included weaving, handcrafted pottery and blacksmithing. Attractions in Kellis included the Temple of Tutu and three churches; the Small East Church is the oldest known church building in Egypt. The site was occupied from the late Ptolemaic Period, was abandoned sometime after the year 392, and has remained unoccupied since then, except for a time in the 1940s, when some Bedouin camped there. Many buildings are buried beneath the sand. The tops of some are visible from the surface; others are hidden, waiting to collapse as an unwary tourist crosses.

== Excavation ==
Archaeological exploration of Kellis began in 1986. Since 1991 the Kellis excavations have been funded by the Australian Research Council, administered by Monash University. Thousands of writing fragments have been unearthed at Kellis, many pertaining to Manichaeism, whose adherents at Kellis apparently lived alongside Christians in ancient times. Archeologists at Kellis have also found wooden books, glass vessels, tools, other domestic items, as well as cemeteries with mummies covered with masks and other cartonnage elements.

== See also ==
- List of ancient Egyptian sites
