= Sobek =

Ancient Egyptian deity

- Sobek, often depicted with the head of a crocodile and a crown composed of ram horns, a sun disk, and feathered plumes.
Name in hieroglyphs
s b k I3
- Major cult center: Faiyum, Crocodilopolis, Kom Ombo
- Symbol: crocodile

Genealogy
- Parents: Set/Khnum and Neith
- Siblings: Tutu, Shemanefer and Ra
- Consort: Renenutet or Meskhenet or Hathor
- Offspring: Khonsu

Sobek or Soobk(Ancient Egyptian: sbk; Ancient Egyptian pronunciation: [ˈsuβkʰə], Coptic: Ⲥⲟⲩⲕ, romanized: Souk), also known as Suchus (Ancient Greek: Σοῦχος, romanized: Soûchos), was an ancient Egyptian deity with a complex history and nature. He is associated with the Nile crocodile and is usually represented as a crocodile or crocodile-headed humanoid. Sobek was also associated with pharaonic power, fertility, and military prowess, but served additionally as a protective deity with apotropaic qualities, invoked especially for protecting others from the dangers presented by the Nile.

== History ==
Sobek enjoyed a longstanding presence in the ancient Egyptian pantheon, from the Old Kingdom of Egypt (c. 2686–2181 BCE) through the Roman period (c. 30 BCE – 350 CE). He is first known from several different Pyramid Texts of the Old Kingdom, particularly from spell PT 317. The spell, which praises the pharaoh as the living incarnation of the crocodile god, reads:

Unis is Sobek, green of plumage, with alert face and raised fore, the splashing one who came from the thigh and tail of the great goddess in the sunlight ... Unis has appeared as Sobek, Neith's son. Unis will eat with his mouth, Unis will urinate and Unis will copulate with his penis. Unis is lord of semen, who takes women from their husbands to the place Unis likes according to his heart's fancy.

The origin of his name, Sbk in Egyptian, is debated among scholars, but many believe that it is derived from a causative of the verb "to impregnate".

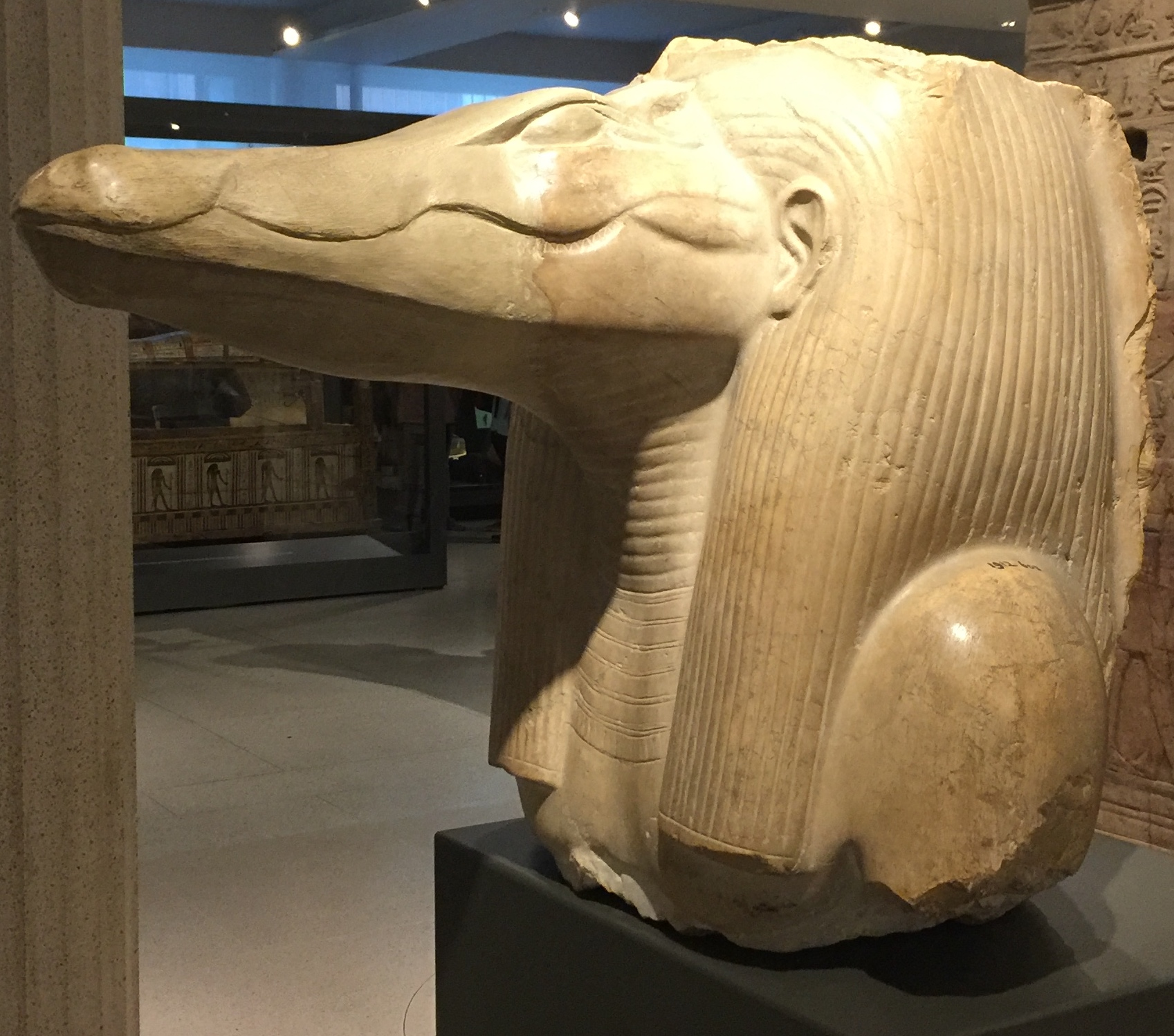
This statue of Sobek was found at Amenemhat III's mortuary temple (which was connected to his pyramid at Hawara in the Faiyum), serving as a testament to this king's devotion to Sobek. Ashmolean Museum, Oxford.

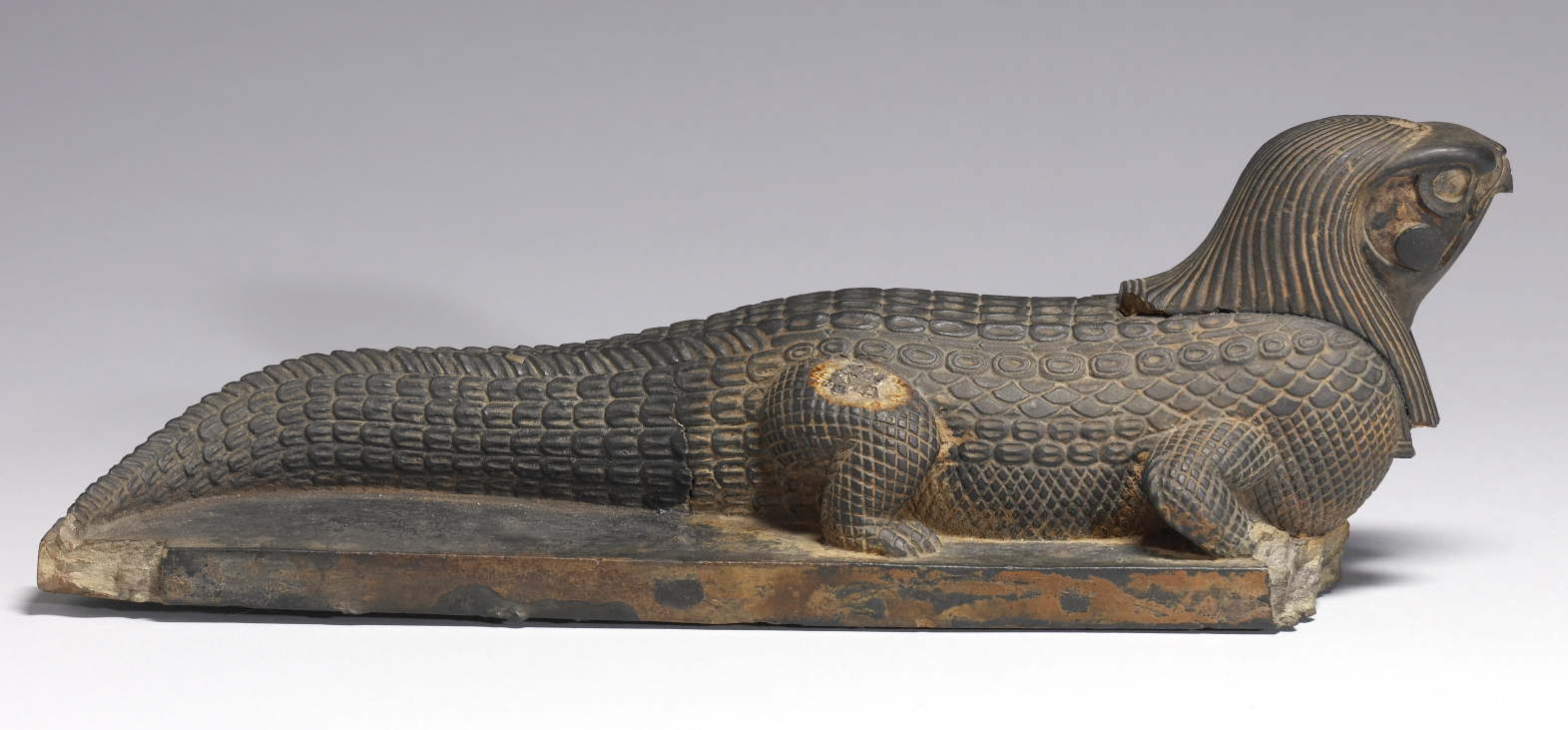
This Late Period (c. 400–250 BCE) statue shows Sobek bearing the falcon head of Re-Harakhti, illustrating the fusion of Sobek and Re into Sobek-Re. Walters Art Museum, Baltimore.

Though Sobek was worshipped in the Old Kingdom, he truly gained prominence in the Middle Kingdom (c. 2055–1650 BCE), most notably under the Twelfth Dynasty pharaoh, Amenemhat III. Amenemhat III had taken a particular interest in the Faiyum of Egypt, a region heavily associated with Sobek. Amenemhat and many of his dynastic contemporaries engaged in building projects to promote Sobek – projects that were often executed in the Faiyum. In this period, Sobek is also said to have undergone an important change: he was often fused with the falcon-headed god of divine kingship, Horus. This brought Sobek even closer with the kings of Egypt, thereby giving him a place of greater prominence in the Egyptian pantheon. The fusion added a finer level of complexity to the god's nature, as he was adopted into the divine triad of Horus and his two parents: Osiris and Isis.

Sobek first acquired a role as a solar deity through his connection to Horus, but this was further strengthened in later periods with the emergence of Sobek-Ra, a fusion of Sobek and Egypt's primary sun god, Ra. Sobek-Horus persisted as a figure in the New Kingdom (1550–1069 BCE), but it was not until the last dynasties of Egypt that Sobek-Ra gained prominence. This understanding of the god was maintained after the fall of Egypt's last native dynasty in Ptolemaic and Roman Egypt (c. 332 BCE–390 CE). The prestige of both Sobek and Sobek-Ra endured in this time period and tributes to him attained greater prominence – both through the expansion of his dedicated cultic sites and a concerted scholarly effort to make him the subject of religious doctrine.

== Cult centers ==
The entire Faiyum region – the "Land of the Lake" in Egyptian (specifically referring to Lake Moeris) – served as a cult center of Sobek. Most Faiyum towns developed their own localized versions of the god, such as Soknebtunis at Tebtunis, Sokonnokonni at Bacchias, and Souxei at an unknown site in the area. At Karanis, two forms of the god were worshipped: Pnepheros and Petsuchos. There, mummified crocodiles were employed as cult images of Petsuchos.

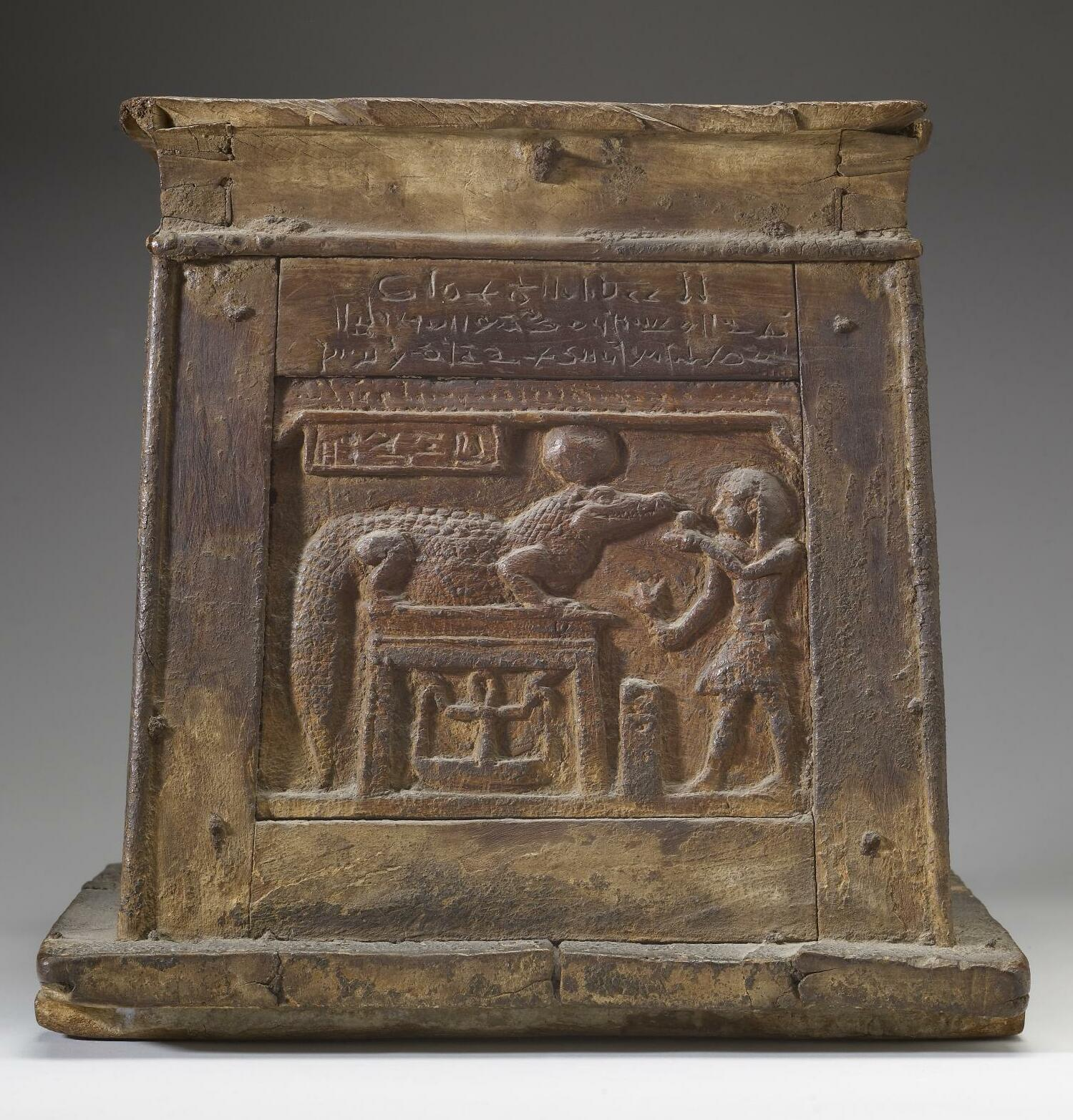
This Roman period box shows a king making an offering to a solar form of Sobek. It is thought that this box could have been used in such offering rituals. Walters Art Museum, Baltimore.

Sobek Shedety, the patron of the Faiyum's centrally located capital, Crocodilopolis (or Egyptian "Shedet"), was the most prominent form of the god. Extensive building programs honoring Sobek were realized in Shedet, as it was the capital of the entire Arsinoite nome and consequently the most important city in the region. It is thought that the effort to expand Sobek's main temple was initially driven by Ptolemy II. Specialized priests in the main temple at Shedet functioned solely to serve Sobek, boasting titles like "prophet of the crocodile-gods" and "one who buries of the bodies of the crocodile-gods of the Land of the Lake". For the Greco-Roman period, the settlements Bakchias, Narmouthis, Soknopaiou Nesos, Tebtunis and Theadelphia at the edges of the Faiyum provide numerous papyri, ostraca and inscriptions that relate to temples and priests of Sobek and his local incarnations: The sources from these five settlements are central to study cult practice, temple economy and social networks of priestly families under Roman rule.

Outside the Faiyum, Kom Ombo, in southern Egypt, was the biggest cultic center of Sobek, particularly during the Ptolemaic and Roman periods. Kom Ombo is located about 30 miles (48 km) north of Aswan and was built during the Graeco-Roman period (332 BCE – 395 CE). The temple at this site was called the "Per-Sobek", meaning the "house of Sobek".

== Character and surrounding mythologies ==
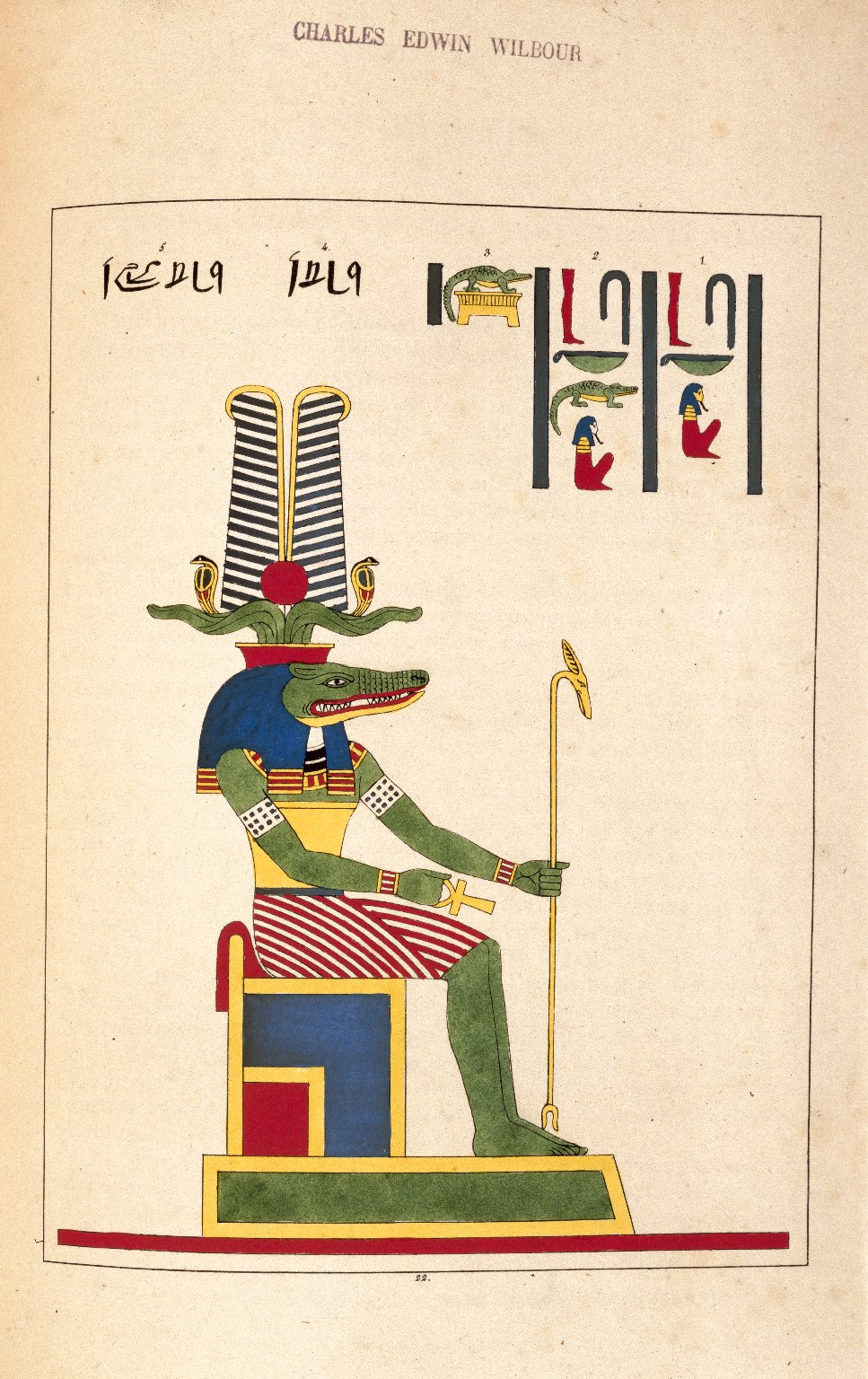
Sovk (Suchus, Cronos, Satrune); by Jean-François Champollion; 1823–1825; Brooklyn Museum (New York City)

Sobek is, above all else, an aggressive and animalistic deity who lives up to the vicious reputation of his patron animal, the large and violent Nile crocodile / West African crocodile. Some of his common epithets portray this nature succinctly, the most notable of which being: "he who loves robbery", "he who eats while he also mates", and "pointed of teeth". However, he also displays grand benevolence in more than one celebrated myth. After his association with Horus and consequent adoption into the Osirian triad of Osiris, Isis, and Horus in the Middle Kingdom, Sobek became associated with Isis as a healer of the deceased Osiris (following his violent murder by Set in the central Osiris myth). In fact, though many scholars believe that the name of Sobek, Sbk, is derived from s-bAk, "to impregnate", others postulate that it is a participial form of the verb sbq, an alternative writing of sAq, "to unite", thereby meaning Sbk could roughly translate to "he who unites (the dismembered limbs of Osiris)".

It is from this association with healing that Sobek was considered a protective deity. His fierceness was able to ward off evil while simultaneously defending the innocent. He was thus made a subject of personal piety and a common recipient of votive offerings, particularly in the later periods of ancient Egyptian history. It was not uncommon, particularly in Ptolemaic and Roman Egypt, for crocodiles to be preserved as mummies to present at Sobek's cultic centers. Sobek was also offered mummified crocodile eggs, meant to emphasize the cyclical nature of his solar attributes as Sobek-Ra.

Likewise, crocodiles were raised for religious reasons as living incarnations of Sobek. Upon their deaths, they were mummified in a grand ritual display as sacred, but earthly, manifestations of their patron god. This practice was executed specifically at the main temple of Crocodilopolis. These mummified crocodiles have been found with baby crocodiles in their mouths and on their backs. The crocodile is one of the few reptiles seen to diligently care for their young, and often transports its offspring in this manner. The practice of preserving this aspect of the animal's behavior via mummification is likely intended to emphasize the protective and nurturing aspects of the fierce Sobek, as he protects the Egyptian people in the same manner that the crocodile protects its young.

In Ptolemaic and Roman Egypt, a local monograph called the Book of the Faiyum centered on Sobek with a considerable portion devoted to the journey made by Sobek-Ra each day with the movement of the sun through the sky. The text also focuses heavily on Sobek's central role in creation as a manifestation of Ra, as he is said to have risen from the primal waters of Lake Moeris, not unlike the Ogdoad in the traditional creation myth of Hermopolis.

Many varied copies of the book exist and many scholars feel that it was produced in large quantities as a "best-seller" in antiquity. The integral relationship between the Faiyum and Sobek is highlighted via this text, and his far reaching influence is seen in localities that are outside the Faiyum as well; a portion of the book is copied on the Upper Egyptian (meaning southern Egyptian) Temple of Kom Ombo.

== Gallery ==
Sobek-Ra with a sun disk

Sobek as a crocodile on a shrine

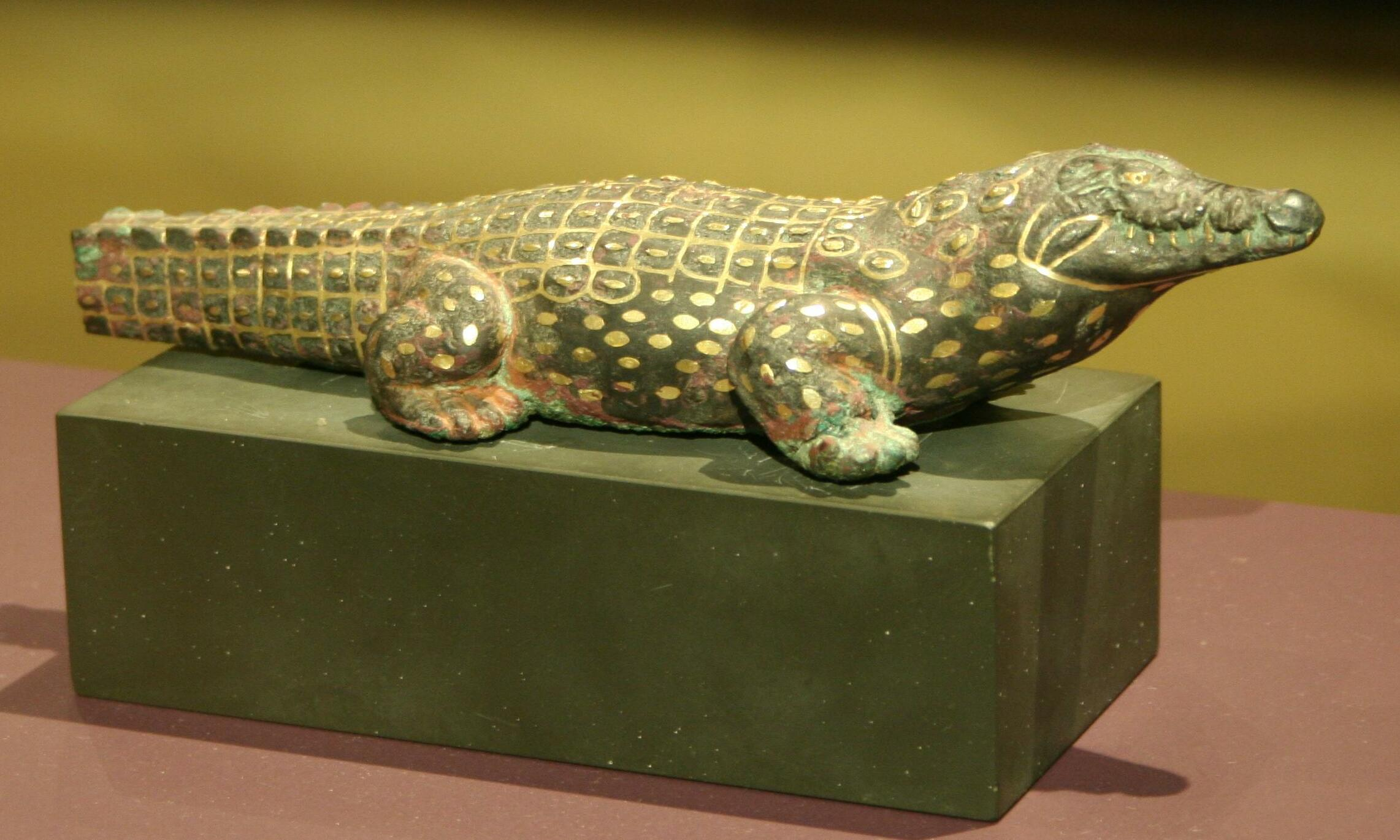
Sobek in his crocodile form; 1991–1802 BCE; Staatliche Sammlung für Ägyptische Kunst (Munich, Germany)

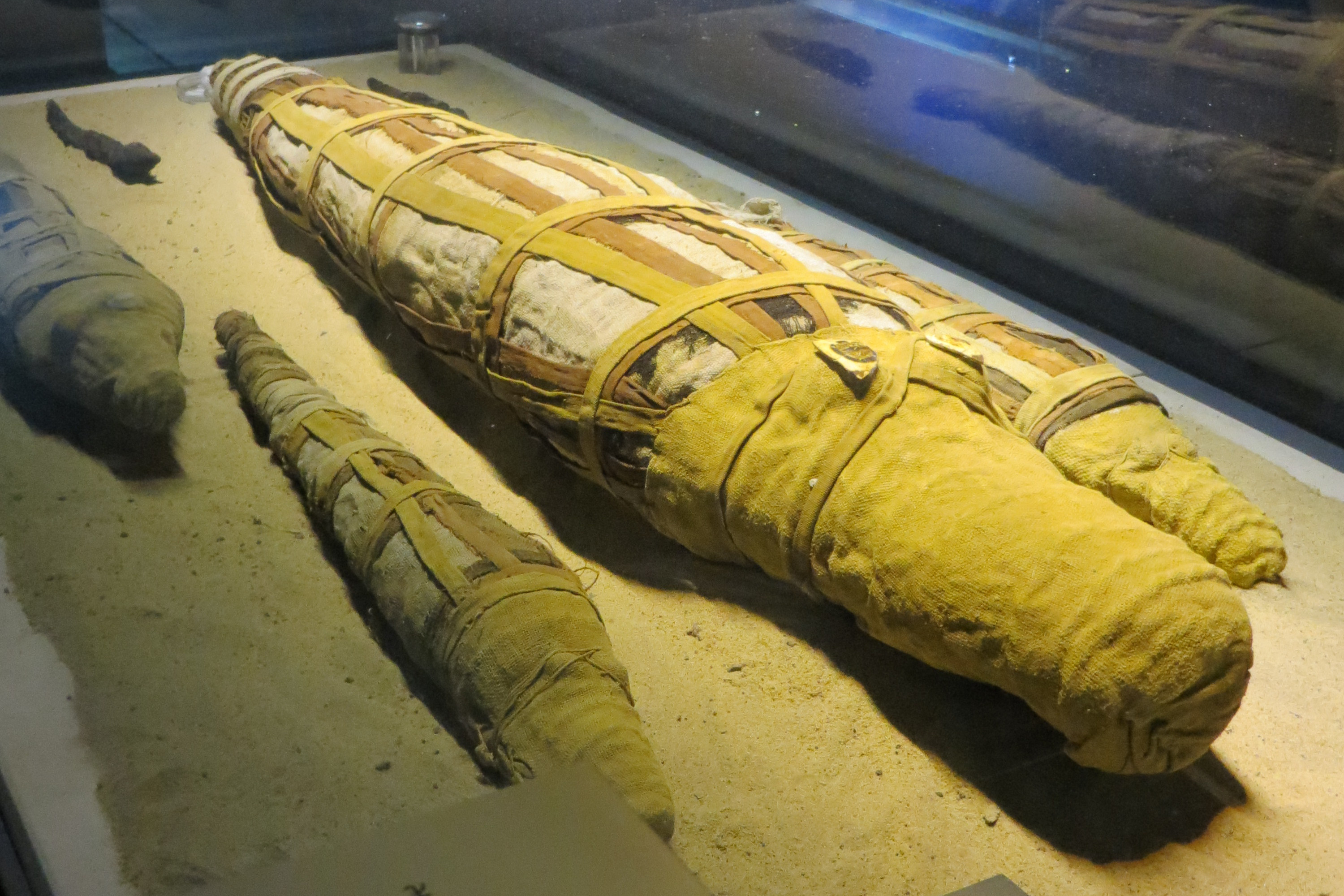
Mummified crocodiles of various ages, in honor of Sobek. Crocodile Museum, Temple of Kom Ombo

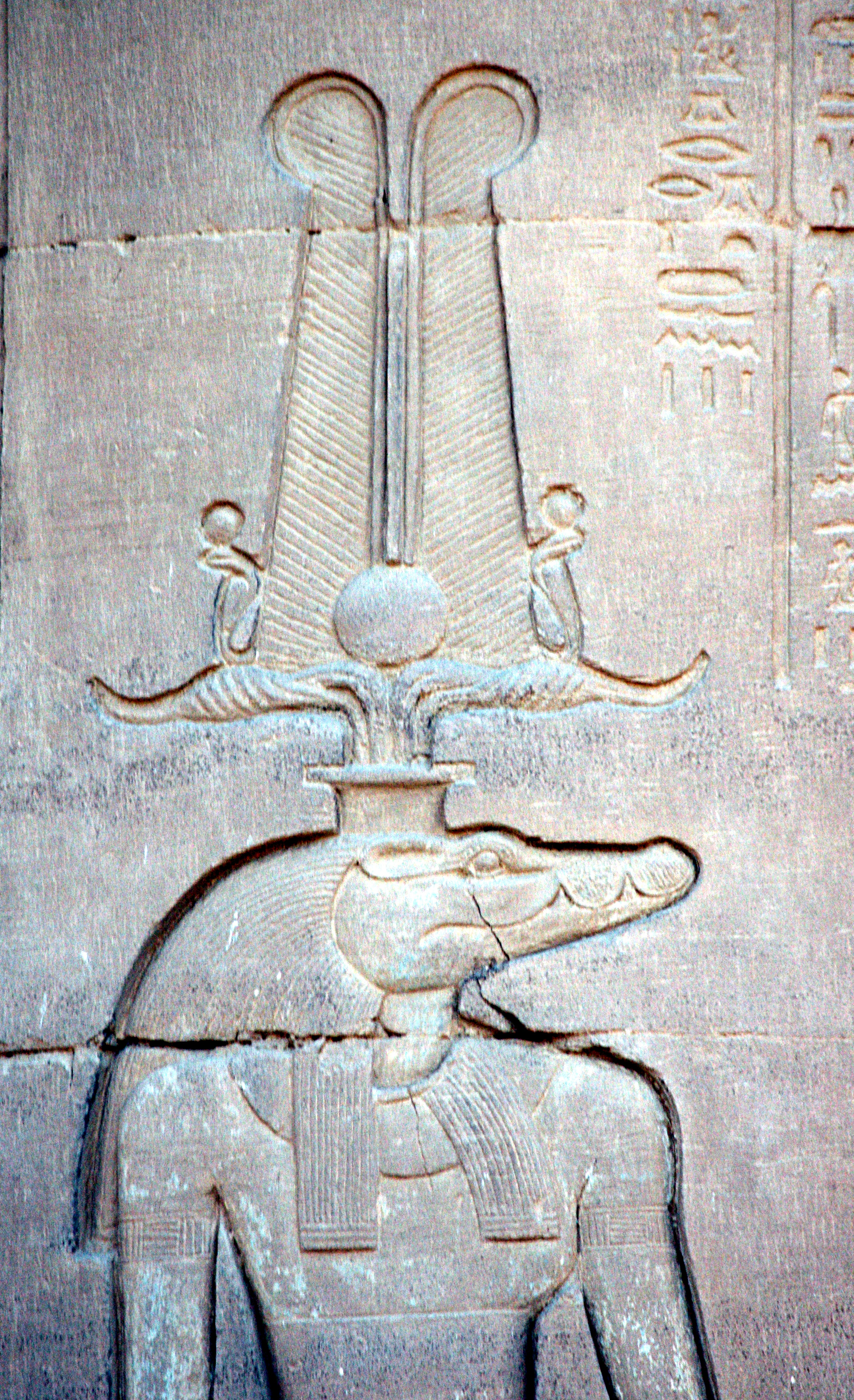
A wall relief from Kom Ombo showing Sobek with solar attributes

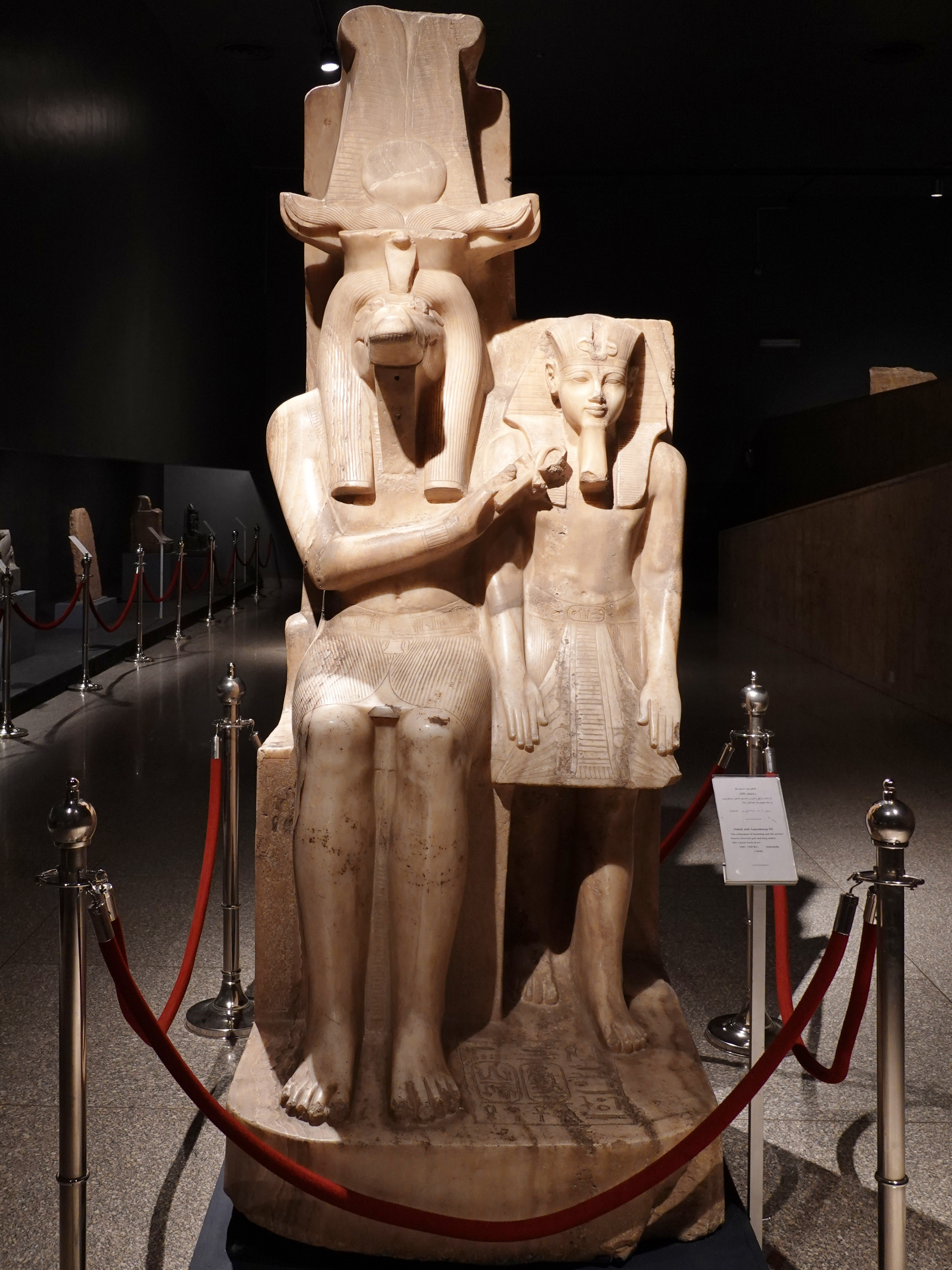
Statue of Sobek and Amenhotep III; 1550–1292 BCE; calcite; Luxor Museum (Luxor, Egypt)

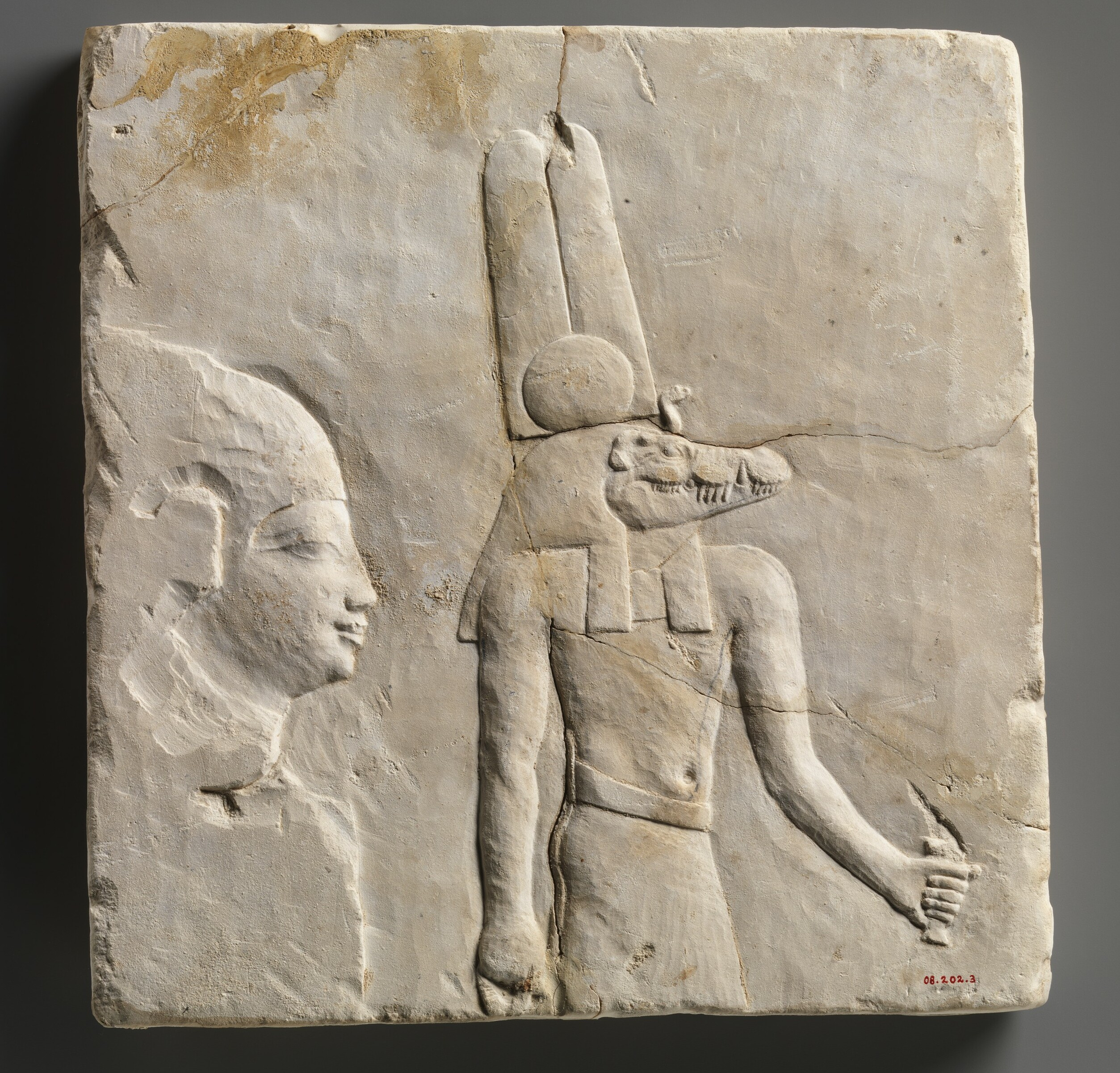
Plaque with head and shoulders of a priestly figure and Sobek; 400–30 BCE; limestone; height: 27.5 cm, width: 25.5 cm; Metropolitan Museum of Art (New York City)

== See also ==
- Ammit, a female crocodile-headed deity in Egyptian mythology
- Crocodiles in Mythology

== Bibliography ==
- Allen, James P.; Manuelian, Peter Der (2005). The Ancient Egyptian Pyramid Texts. Atlanta: Society of Biblical Literature. p. 471. ISBN 9781589831827.
- Bresciani, Edda (2005). "Sobek, Lord of the Land of the Lake". Divine Creatures: Animal Mummies in Ancient Egypt. Cairo: The American University in Cairo Press. pp. 199–206. ISBN 9789774248580.
- Frankfurter, David (1998). Religion in Roman Egypt: Assimilation and Resistance. Princeton: Princeton University Press. p. 314. ISBN 978-0-691-07054-4.
- Ikram, Salima (2005). "Protecting Pets and Cleaning Crocodiles: The Animal Mummy Project". Divine Creatures: Animal Mummies in Ancient Egypt. Cairo: The American University in Cairo Press. pp. 207–227. ISBN 9789774248580.
- Murray, Mary Alice (2004). The Splendor that was Egypt. London: Courier Corporation. p. 256. ISBN 9780486431000.
- O'Connor, David. "From Topography to Cosmos: Ancient Egypt's Multiple Maps". In Ancient Perspectives: Maps and Their Place in Mesopotamia, Egypt, Greece, and Rome, edited by Richard J.A. Talbert, 47–79. Chicago: University of Chicago Press, 2012.
- Tait, John. "The 'Book of the Fayum': Mystery in a Known Landscape". In Mysterious Lands, edited by David O'Connor and Stephen Quirke, 183–202. Portland: Cavendish Publishing, 2003.
- Zecchi, Marco (2010). Sobek of Shedet : The Crocodile God in the Fayyum in the Dynastic Period. Umbria: Tau Editrice. p. 206. ISBN 9788862441155.

=== Further reading ===
- Beinlich, Horst. Das Buch vom Fayum: zum religiösen Eigenverständnis einer ägyptischen Landschaft. Wiesbaden: Harrassowitz, 1991.
- Dolzani, Claudia. Il Dio Sobk. Roma: Accademia nazionale dei Lincei, 1961.
- Kockelmann, Holger. Der Herr der Seen, Sümpfe und Flussläufe: Untersuchungen zum Gott Sobek und den ägyptischen Krokodilgötter-Kulten von den Anfängen bis zur Römerzeit. Wiesbaden: Harrassowitz, 2018.
- Barney, Quinten. 'Sobek: The Idolatrous God of Pharaoh Amenemhet III.' Journal of the Book of Mormon and Other Restoration Scripture. Vol. 22, No. 2 (2013), pp. 22–27.
- Benjamin Sippel: Gottesdiener und Kamelzüchter: Das Alltags- und Sozialleben der Sobek-Priester im kaiserzeitlichen Fayum. Wiesbaden: Harrassowitz, 2020, ISBN 978-3-447-11485-1
