= Neith =

Ancient Egyptian goddess

- The Egyptian goddess Neith wearing the shield or sheath on her head, holding the ankh and the was-sceptre. She sometimes wears the Red Crown of Lower Egypt.
Name in hieroglyphs
R24
or
n t R25 B1
- Major cult center: Sais, Esna
- Symbol: bow, shield or sheath, arrows, ankh, loom, mummy cloth, click beetle
- Parents: None (self-created in some traditions)
- Consort: Khnum,
- Offspring: Sobek, Ra, Apep, (Note: Due to his serpentine form, Apep was sometimes said to originate from Ra's umbilical cord.) Tutu, Serket

Neith wearing the Red Crown of Lower Egypt.

Neith /ˈniː.ɪθ/ (Koine Greek: Νηΐθ), also spelled Nit, Net, or Neit, was an ancient Egyptian goddess, possibly of Libyan origin. She was associated with warfare, symbolized by her emblem of crossed bows, and with motherhood, as texts refer to her as the mother of deities such as the sun god Ra and the crocodile god Sobek.

As a mother goddess, she was sometimes described as the creator of the world in Egyptian creation myths and referred to as the "Great Mother". She also played a role in funerary religion. Over time she became one of the four goddesses who protected the coffin and the internal organs of the deceased.

Neith is among the earliest Egyptian deities attested in the archaeological record. Evidence of her worship dates to the Naqada II period (c. 3600–3350 BC). Her main cult center was the city of Sais in the western Nile Delta.

She was particularly important during the Early Dynastic Period (c. 3100–2686 BC) and had a major sanctuary at Memphis. Later, other goddesses such as Hathor rose in prominence, though Neith remained important, especially during the Twenty-sixth Dynasty (664–525 BC), when Sais became Egypt's capital. During the Greek and Roman periods she continued to be worshipped in temples including Esna, and Greek writers identified her with the goddess Athena.

== Symbolism ==
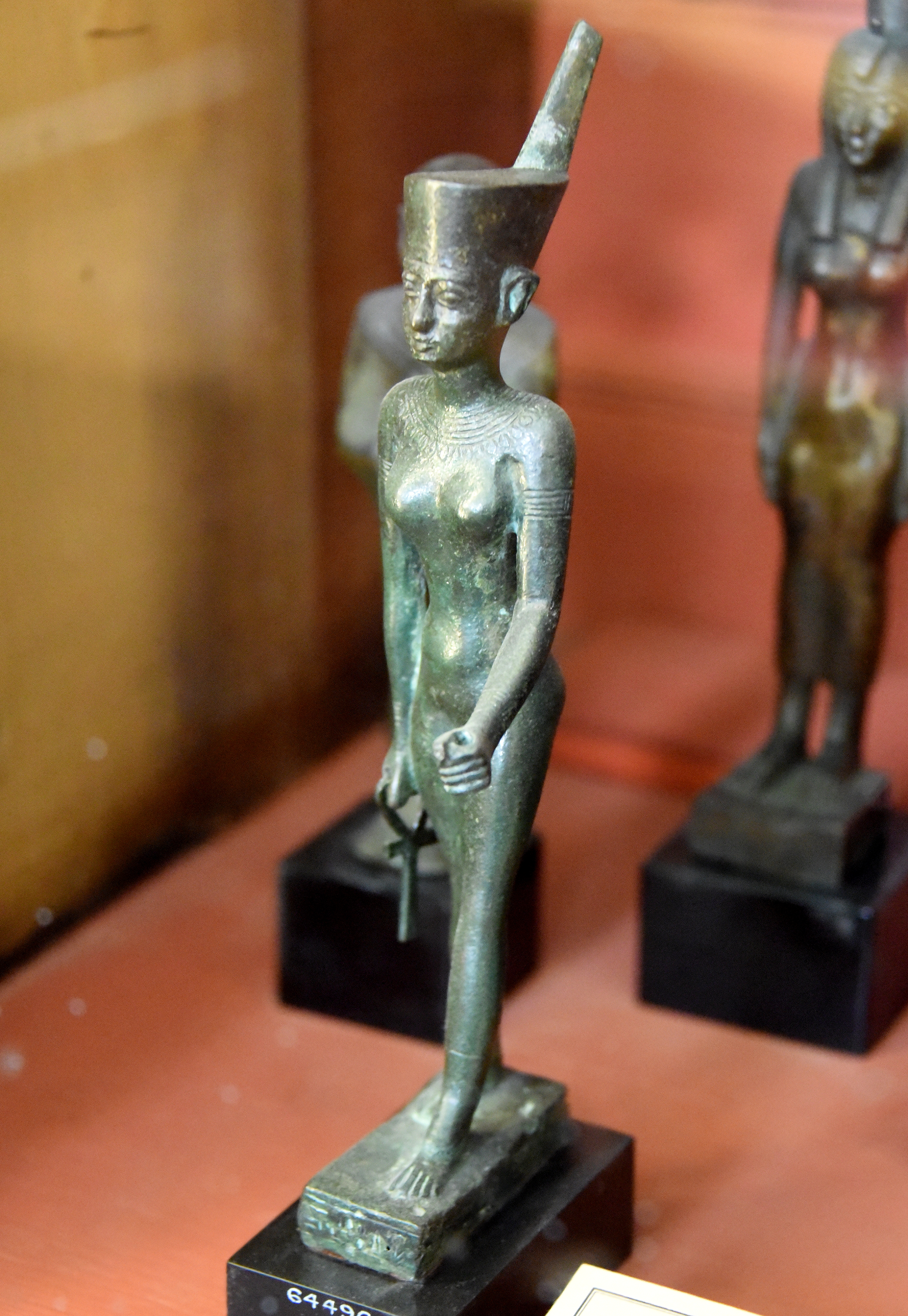
Bronze statuette of Neith wearing the Red Crown of Lower Egypt (British Museum).

Neith is typically depicted as a woman wearing the Red Crown of Lower Egypt and holding a bow and arrows. She is therefore often interpreted as a goddess of war and hunting. Her hieroglyphic symbol consists of two bows crossed over a shield.

In Egyptian art the symbol of crossed bows and arrows often appears above her head and also served as the emblem of the city of Sais.

As a deity, Neith is frequently shown carrying the was-sceptre (a symbol of power) and the ankh (a symbol of life). She was sometimes associated with Mehet-Weret, a cosmic cow goddess who gave birth to the sun daily.

Because of these associations, Neith was also connected with the primordial waters of creation and with the renewal of the cosmos.

== Attributes ==
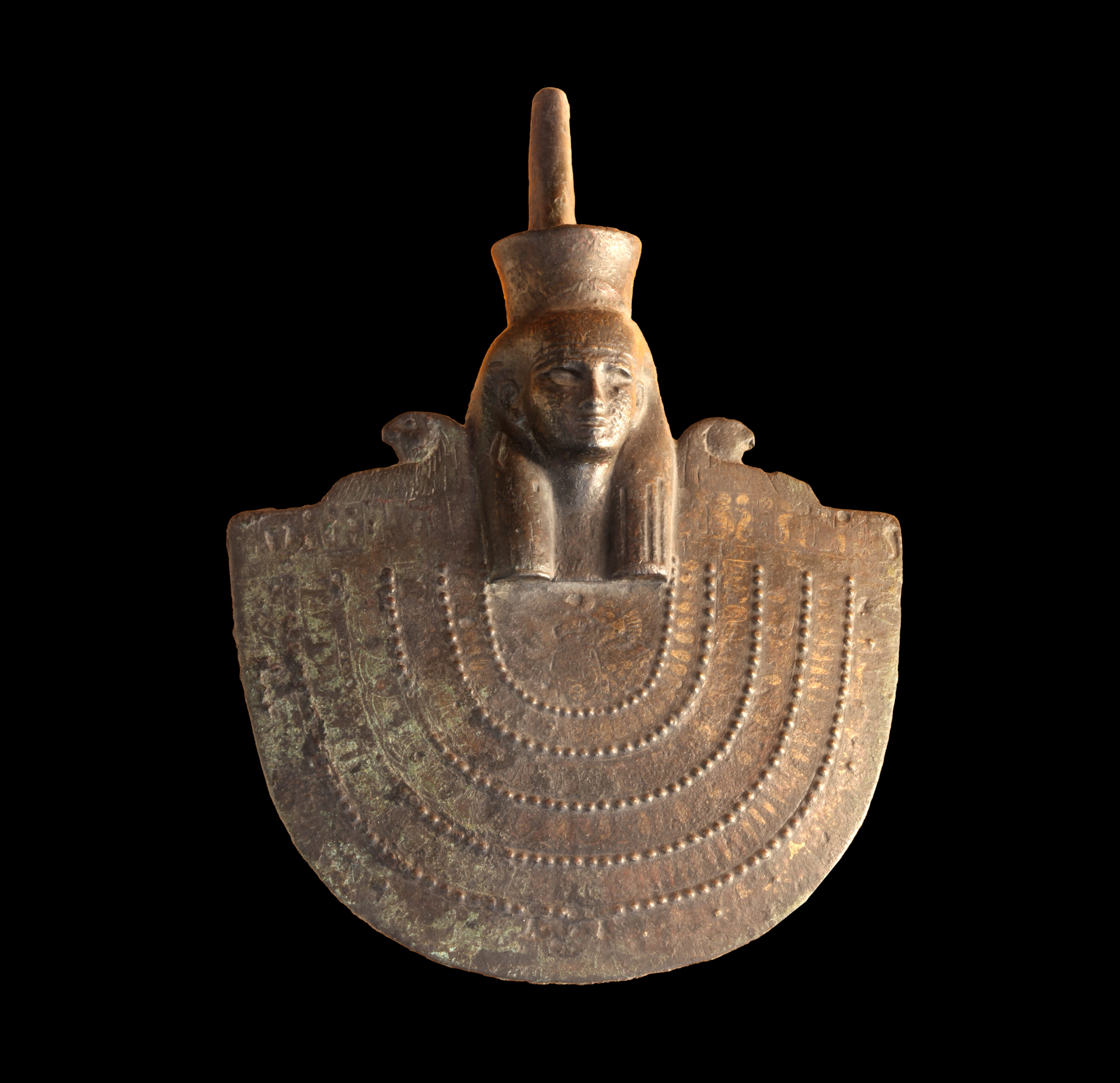
Aegis of Neith, Twenty-sixth Dynasty of Egypt

Neith possessed many roles in Egyptian religion. In early texts she was described as an “Opener of the Ways”, an epithet also used for the god Wepwawet. This title may refer to both her role in warfare and her function as a guide of souls in the afterlife.

She was also associated with weaving and textile production, and through this connection she became linked with the linen wrappings of mummies.

In funerary contexts Neith sometimes appears alongside Isis, Nephthys, and Serket as one of the goddesses protecting the dead. In later religious traditions she was associated with the protection of one of the Four sons of Horus, specifically Duamutef.

The name "Neith" is hypothesized to mean "the terrifying one."

== Mythology ==
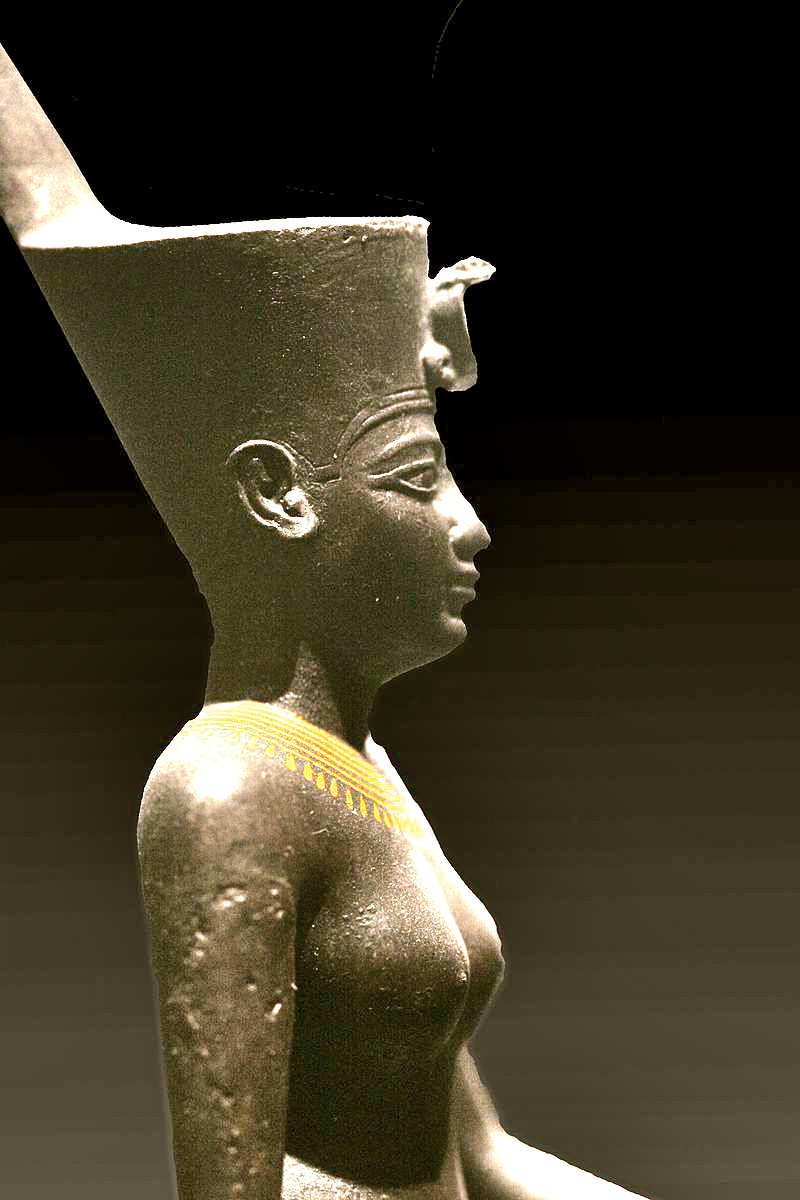
Neith wearing the Deshret crown of Lower Egypt.

In some Egyptian myths Neith was described as the mother of Ra and Apep. Starting during the New Kingdom she was referred to as "the Mother and Father of all things." In other traditions she was associated with the crocodile god Sobek, especially in regions near the Nile.

As a creator goddess and patron of weaving, she was said to reweave the world daily on her loom.

An inscription from the temple at Esna records a myth in which Neith created the first land from the primordial waters of Nun. In this account she brings the world into existence through her thoughts.

A famous inscription associated with her temple at Sais was reported by the philosopher Proclus:

“I am all that has been, is, and will be. No mortal has ever lifted my veil.”

According to myth, the gods once consulted Neith during the dispute between Horus and Set over the Egyptian throne. She advised that Horus should become king.

An annual celebration known as the Feast of Lamps was held in her honor. According to the historian Herodotus, participants lit numerous lamps throughout the night during the festival.

== Syncretism ==
Greek writers identified Neith with the goddess Athena. The philosopher Plato refers to this association in his dialogue Timaeus.

Some scholars have suggested that Neith may also be connected with the “Veiled Isis” described by Plutarch in On Isis and Osiris.

== See also ==
- Neith (hypothetical moon)
- Merneith
- Neithhotep
