= Tutu (Egyptian god) =

Ancient Egyptian deity

- A depiction of Tutu as a lion with a human head, wearing the Double Feather crown, the Solar Disk and Ram Horns.
Name in hieroglyphs
t W t W A53
- Major cult center: Kellis
- Symbol: Lion, Sphinx, weaponry
- Parents: Neith

Tutu (Ancient Egyptian: twtw - meaning "image"; Tithoes in Greek) was an Egyptian god worshipped by ordinary people all over Egypt during the Late Period. The only known temple dedicated to Tutu is located in ancient Kellis. However, reliefs depicting Tutu are seen in other temples, such as the Temple of Kalabsha. Tutu's title at the Shenhur temple was "Who comes to the one calling him". Other titles of his are "Son of Neith," "the Lion," "Great of Strength", and "Master of the demons of Sekhmet and the wandering demons of Bastet".

== Iconography ==
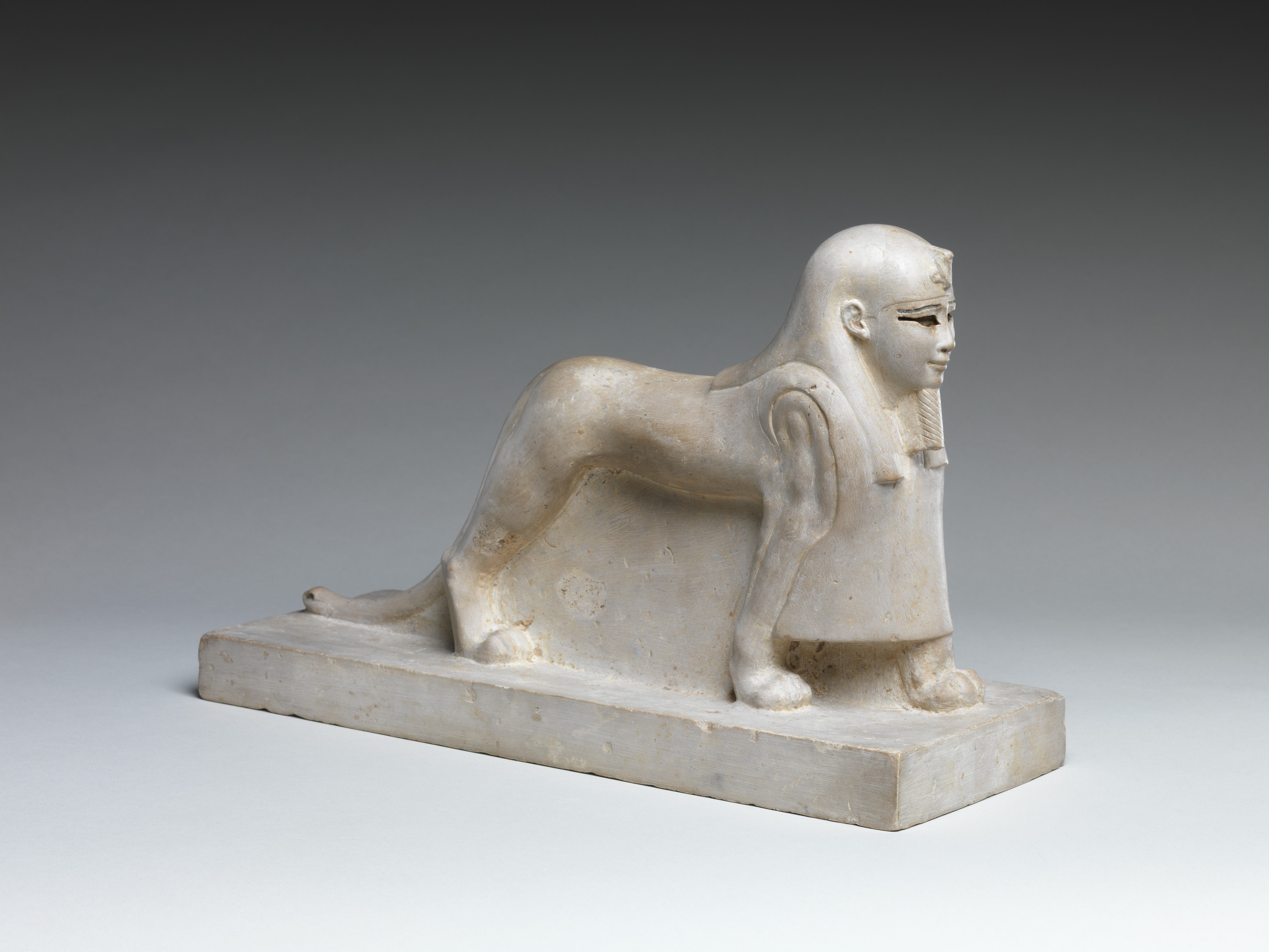
Sphinx of the deity Tutu (Metropolitan Museum of Art)

Tutu's iconography is anthropomorphic, consisting of the body of a striding, winged lion, the head of a human, other heads of hawks and crocodiles projecting from the body, and the tail of a serpent. He was the son of Neith, who was considered as a "dangerous goddess". Other goddesses in the same aspect were named as Mut, Sekhmet, Nekhbet and Bastet. This meant that Tutu is placed in a position of power over demons. It was his role to slay demons sent out by "dangerous goddesses"; other sons of these goddesses performed the same function. These were Maahes, Khonsu and Nefertem. Originally the protector of tombs, Tutu later guarded the sleeping from danger or bad dreams. Tutu was also regarded for ordinary people to worship, offering and rituals were made on portable altars. Offerings included goose and bread, and rituals were for protection from demons and bad dreams. Tutu was stated to have given protection from demons, giving longer life and protecting people from the Netherworld.
