= Ghamaza El-Sughra =

Ghamaza El-Sughra غمازة الصغرى
- Administrative unit
- Location of Ghamaza El-Sughra in Egypt
- Coordinates: 30.032021°N 31.110449°E
- Country: Egypt
- Governorate: Giza
- Center: El-Saf

Population (2006)
  - Total: 4,836
- Time zone: UTC+2 (EET)
  - Summer (DST): UTC+3 (EEST)

Ghamaza El-Sughra (Arabic: غمازة الصغرى) is an administrative unit affiliated with the El-Saf Center in the Giza Governorate, Egypt. According to the 2006 population census, Ghamaza El-Sughra had a total population of 4,836, including 2,447 males and 2,389 females.

== Administrative divisions ==
Ghamaza El-Sughra includes the following villages:

- Ghamaza El-Sughra
- Arab El-Hasar Bahriya
- Nogou El-Arab
- Nazlat Aleyan
- El-Hayy
