= Hussein Bassir =

Egyptian archaeologist

Dr Hussein Bassir was an Egyptian archaeologist of Giza Pyramids and one of the directors (field director) of the excavation team in the Valley of the Golden Mummies at Bahariya Oasis. In 1994, he got his BA in Egyptology from Cairo University. In 2009, he got his PhD in Near Eastern Studies from the Johns Hopkins University, Baltimore, Maryland, United States. He is also the author of several works of fiction in Arabic on ancient Egypt such as In Search for Khnum and The Old Red Hippopotamus. Bassir worked as a member of several archaeological teams and participated in many archaeological excavations in sites all over Egypt. His written works include commentaries on Arabic literature, Arabic cinema, Egyptology and Archaeology. He is the Director of Antiquities Museum at the Library of Alexandria.

== Related links ==
- Al-Ahram Weekly: Losing Their Heads
- Hussein Bassir at the NG
- Al-Ahram Weekly: Face to face with the Golden Mummies
- Arab World Books Directory
- Excerpt from Hussein Bassir's novel: The Old Red Hippopotamus
- Article about Tutankhamun in Al Arabi Magazine
