= Abaset =

Ancient Egyptian deity

- Abaset as a woman with a vulture crown and a hedgehog headdress as she was depicted in the tomb of Bannentiu, the only place where she has been mentioned
Name in hieroglyphs
a Z1 b a z t H8

Abaset is an ancient Egyptian hedgehog goddess, known to have been venerated at the capital, El-Bawiti, of the Bahariya Oasis during the 26th Dynasty.

She is depicted three times on the tomb walls of Qarat Qasr Salim, Bahariya Oasis, including twice in the Tomb of Bannentiu. In these representations, she was in an anthropomorphic form, wearing a tripartite wig with a vulture cap, with a hedgehog on top that was specific to her. In the Tomb of Bannentiu, there is also an inscription that includes the goddess, which is one of only two attestations of her name.

She is not attested to in any other ancient sites.
