= Border Authority =

Military administrative area

Border Authority مصلحة الحدود
- Military administrative area
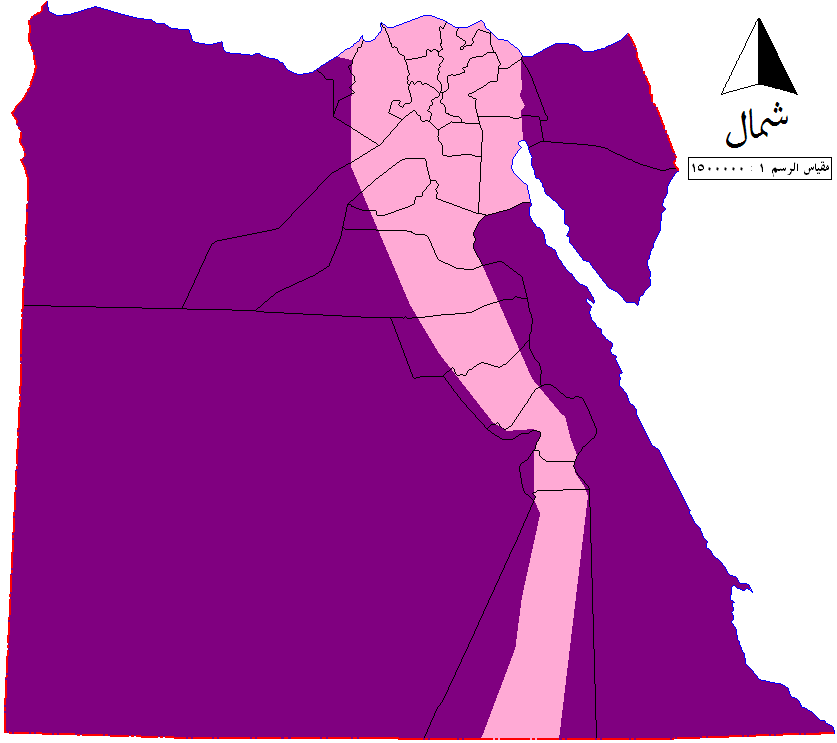

The Border Authority (Egyptian Arabic: مصلحة الحدود) was an Egyptian administrative authority, established in 1917 by a decision of the Commander-in-Chief of the British forces in Egypt, and approved by the Presidency of the Egyptian Council of Ministers. It was initially called the Border Divisions Authority (مصلحة أقسام الحدود). The administration of this authority included the regions of the Sinai Peninsula, the Eastern Desert, the Red Sea coast, the Western Desert, and the oases.

== History ==
The Border Divisions Authority was established by the decision of the Commander-in-Chief of the British Forces in Egypt on January 21, 1917, to be headed by an officer appointed by the Commander-in-Chief of the British Forces. The decision was officially implemented and notified to government agencies on May 24, 1917, and according to the decision, the department became composed of the governorates: Western Desert, Southern Desert, and Sinai.

On October 5, 1922, a decree was issued by the Ministry of War attaching the administration of the border divisions department directly to the Ministry of War.

On September 26, 1925, a decision was issued by the Minister of War to name the authority as the Border Authority, instead of the Border Divisions Authority. The total number of cities and villages belonging to it was 88 towns.

== Western Desert Governorate ==
Its capital was Marsa Matrouh, and the governorate was administratively divided into:

- Salloum Section, its capital was Salloum.
- Matrouh Section, its capital was Marsa Matrouh.
- The Eastern Section, its capital was Borg El Arab.
- Ma'moria of El Wahat El Bahariya, its center was Bawiti.
- Siwa Oases Section, its capital was Siwa.

According to Authority Circular No. 144 of 1931, the governorate now included:

- Mariout Center, its capital was Al-Amiriyya.
- El Wahat El Bahariya Center, its capital was Bawiti.
- Matrouh Center, its capital was Marsa Matrouh.
- Siwa Center, its capital was Siwa.

The Eastern Section and the Salloum Section were canceled and annexed to the Matrouh Center. The Siwa Oases section was abolished, becoming Siwa Center, which also included the Farafra Oasis. The Bahariya Oases Ma'moria was abolished, becoming the Bahariya Oases Center.

== Southern Desert Governorate ==
Its capital was Kharga, and the governorate was administratively divided into:

- El Wahat El Kharga Center, its capital was Kharga.
- El Wahat El Dakhla Center, its capital was Mut.

== Sinai Governorate ==
Its capital was Arish, and the governorate was administratively divided into:

- Sinai Maritime Section, its capital was Arish.
- Mediterranean Sinai Section, its capital was Nekhel.
- The Southern Sinai Section, its capital was El Tor.
- Qantara Section, its capital was Qantara.
- Red Sea Section, its capital was Hurghada.
