= Nebemakhet =

Ancient Egyptian prince and vizier

- Vizier of Egypt
Egyptian name
nb m Ax t iwNb m 3ḫ.t
- Tenure: c. 2520 BC
- Pharaoh: Menkaure
- Burial: Giza, Giza Governorate, Egypt
- Spouse: Nubhotep
- Father: Khafre
- Mother: Meresankh III

Nebemakhet /nɛbɛmɑːˈxɛt/ (fl. c. 2520 BC) was a king's son and a vizier during the 4th Dynasty. Nebemakhet was the son of King Khafre and Queen Meresankh III. He is shown in his mother's tomb and in his own tomb at Giza.

== Family ==
Nebemakhet is depicted in the tomb of his mother Meresankh III (G7530-5440). His brothers Duaenre, Niuserre (A), and Khenterka as shown there as well, as is a sister named Shepsetkau. His maternal grandfather was the Crown Prince Kawab. Nebemakhet was married to a lady named Nubhotep. In Nebemakhet's own tomb, his brothers Duaenre and Niuserre are mentioned as well as a brother named Ankhmare. Nebemakhet's sister appears several times in scenes accompanying her brother.

== Titles ==
Nebemakhet was a King's Son of His Body and a Hereditary Prince and would have grown up at court. He held many titles during his life including Eldest of the Senwet [house] of His Father, Scribe of the Divine Book of His Father, Sole Confidant of His Father, Master of the Secrets of His Father, Chief Justice and Vizier, Chief Ritualist, and High-priest (of the Ha-god).

== Burial ==
=== Tomb G 8172 (Lepsius 86) ===
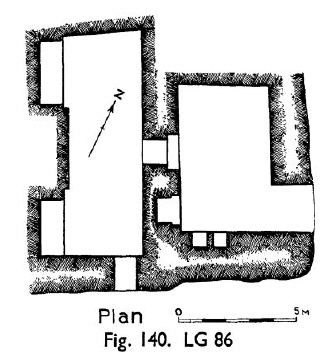
Floor plan of Nebemakhet's tomb, L86

He was buried in tomb G 8172 (=LG 86) after his original tomb (LG 12) was abandoned. The tomb is located in the Central Field which is part of the Giza Necropolis. The tomb was in a highly finished state when Nebemakhet died. The wall were carved in relief and painted in bright colors. The tomb consists of two decorated chapels and several shafts. The main entrance leads to the outer chapel which contained several niches and a shaft in the north-west corner. A doorway leads to another room containing several more niches and an inner chapel. This second room contained two more burial shafts.

The outer chapel shows Nebemakhet and his sister Shepsetkau viewing some agricultural scenes on the south wall. Parts of scenes depicting the capturing of birds in nets can still be seen. The western wall shows Nebemakhet in a papyrus boat in the marshes with a fish-spear in his hand. The scene is largely destroyed because (in antiquity) a large niche was cut in the wall. Remaining scenes show people carrying fish, birds and other animals. One register shows the construction of a papyrus canoe and then a scene of cattle crossing a river. The wall contains a depiction of a line of offer bearers bringing property from the estates of Khafre.

In the doorway to the inner chapel a scene is preserved showing the sculptor Semerka and his colleague Inkaf. These two men were responsible for some of the work in the tomb. The inscription reads: "His Rewarded One, who inscribed for him this, his tomb, the Sculptor Semerka. His Rewarded One, who made for him this, his tomb, with the work [..] In-ka-f".

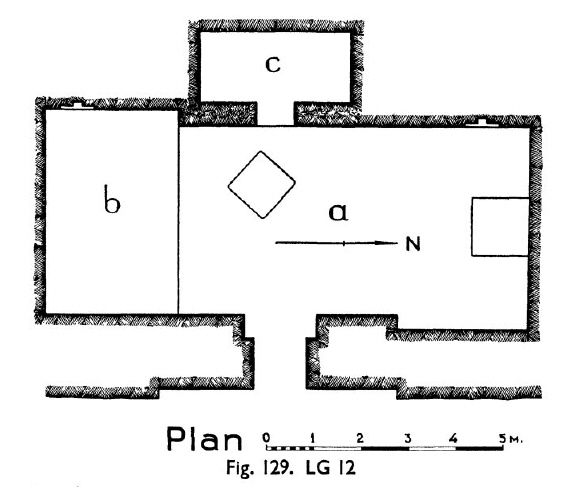
Floor plan of Nebemakhet's first tomb, L12

In the inner room Nebemakhet and his sister Shepsetkau appear before their mother: "His Mother, She Who Sees Horus and Set, The Great Ornament, the Great Favourite (or Praised), the King's Wife Meresankh". Nearby Nebemakhet is depicted in a scene with his sister and this time they are accompanied by their brother Duaenre. Nubhotep, Nebemakhet's wife, is also depicted in the inner chapel. She has the titles royal acquaintance, Priestess of Hathor, Mistress of the Sycamore in all her places, Honored by the god. Further scenes in the inner chapel show scenes from daily life including craft shops and metalwork.

=== Tomb Lepsius 12 ===
Tomb LG 12 is a tomb in the Quarry Cemetery West of Second Pyramid. This tomb is sometimes referred to as the "Tomb of Palm-tree Beams". The doorway on the east wall leads to a large hall. The roof is carved to resemble logs of wood.

== Ancestry ==
Ancestors of Nebemakhet

Khufu
Khafre
Nebemakhet
Khufu
Kawab
Meritites I
Meresankh III
Khufu
Hetepheres II
