= El-Saf =

El-Saf الصف
- Markaz
- Location of El-Saf in Egypt
- Coordinates: 29°25′N 31°15′E
- Country: Egypt
- Governorate: Giza

Area
  - Total: 39.0 sq mi (100.9 km^{2})

Population (2006)
  - Total: 45,131
- Time zone: UTC+2 (EET)
  - Summer (DST): UTC+3 (EEST)

El-Saf (Arabic: الصف) is one of the districts (markazes) of the Giza Governorate in Egypt.

== Etymology ==
The name "El-Saf" is said to derive from the shrine of Sheikh Ali El-Safi located in the city of El-Saf. Another interpretation suggests the name refers to the alignment ("صف") of all buildings in one single row.

== Establishment ==
The El-Saf city council was established following Local Administration Law No. 124 of 1960, using a temporary building within El-Saf Industrial School. A dedicated city council building was constructed in 1964.

Due to the large area of El-Saf (which originally included Atfih), Prime Ministerial Decree No. 76 of 1988 split El-Saf into two separate markazes:

- El-Saf
- Atfih

== Geography ==
El-Saf is located to the east of the Nile River, along the El-Saf / Al-Kureimat road (Route 21). It is bordered to the north by Al-Tebbin District, to the south by Atfih Markaz, to the east by the Eastern Desert, and to the west by the Nile River.

== Administrative divisions ==
El-Saf Markaz is divided into six administrative units:

Administrative divisions of El-Saf
Division	Included villages
El-Saf city	El-Saf El-Balad
El-Wadi	El-Wadi, Askar, El-Desmi
El-Shobak El-Sharqi	El-Shobak El-Sharqi, El-Menya, Arab Abu Saad
Al-Ikhsas	Al-Ikhsas, Ghamaza El-Kubra, Kafr Tarkhan, Al-Turfa and Al-Atiyat
Al-Aqwas	Al-Aqwas, Arab El-Ababda, El-Manshiya, Arab El-Hasar Qebly, El-Fahmin, El-Gazira El-Shokraa
Ghamaza El-Sughra	Ghamaza El-Sughra, Arab El-Hasar Bahriya, Nogou El-Arab, Nazlat Aleyan, El-Hayy

== Demographics ==
According to the 2006 census, the population of El-Saf Markaz was 45,131.
