= Al-Metania =

- Administrative unit
- Location of Al-Metania in Egypt
- Country: Egypt
- Governorate: Giza
- Markaz: Al-Ayyat

Population (2006)
  - Total: 14,914
- Time zone: UTC+2 (EET)
  - Summer (DST): UTC+3 (EEST)

Al-Metania (Arabic: المتانيا) is an administrative unit affiliated with Al-Ayyat district in Giza Governorate, Egypt. According to the 2006 census, the total population of Al-Metania was 14,914, including 7,619 males and 7,295 females.

== Administrative Division ==
Al-Metania includes five administrative subdivisions:

- Al-Metania
- Bamha
- Kafr Shehata
- Al-Lasht
- Al-Gomla
