= Abdelrahman Rashdan =

Egyptian footballer (born 2003)

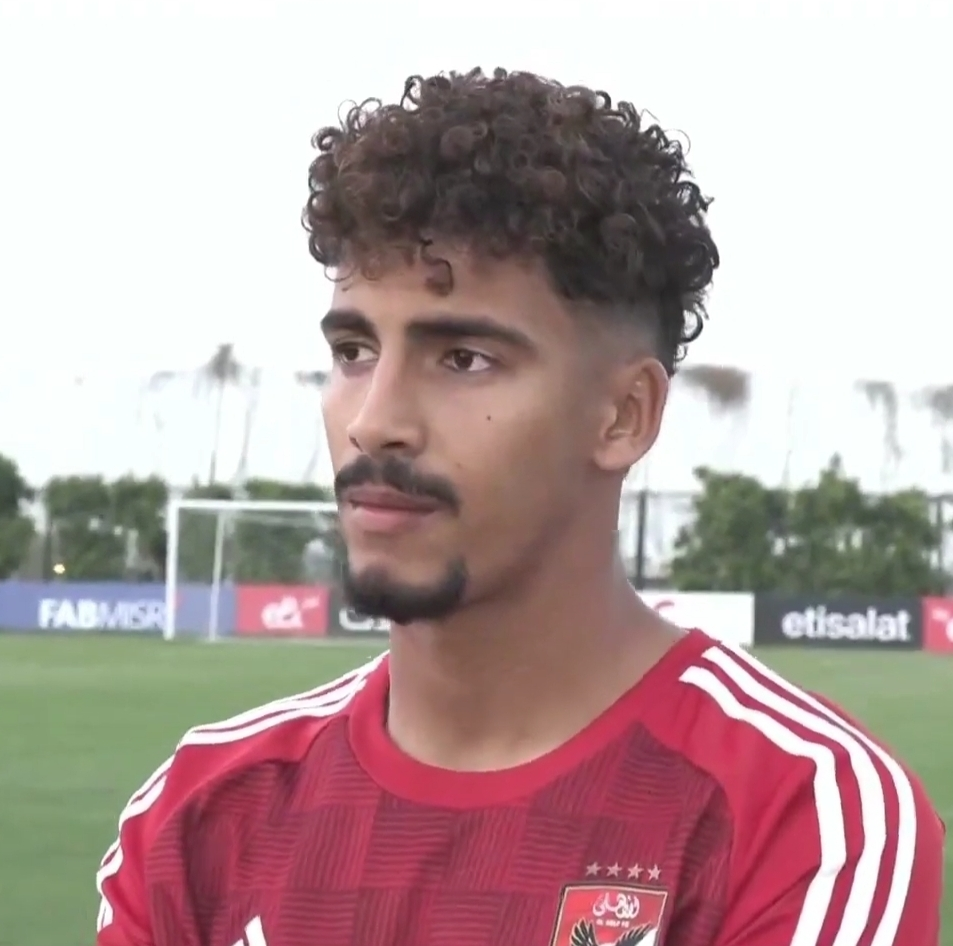
- Rashdan with Al Ahly

Personal information
- Full name: Abdelrahman Rashdan Mohamed Mohamed Abo Hamada
- Date of birth: 1 January 2003 (age 23)
- Place of birth: Abu El Numrus, Giza, Egypt
- Height: 1.89 m (6 ft 2 in)
- Positions: Centre back; defensive midfielder

Youth career
- 2016–2020: Wadi Degla
- 2022–2024: Al Ahly

Senior career*
Years	Team	Apps	(Gls)
2020–2022	Wadi Degla	2	(0)
2022–2026	Al Ahly	0	(0)
2024–2025	→ Modern Sport (loan)	13	(1)

International career
2022–2023	Egypt U20	6	(1)
- * Club domestic league appearances and goals as of 5 January 2026

Abdelrahman Rashadan Mohamed Mohamed Abo Hamada (Arabic: عبدالرحمن رشدان; born 1 January 2003) is an Egyptian professional footballer who plays as a centre-back for the Egypt U20.

== Club career ==
=== Wadi Degla ===
Rashdan Started his professional career with Wadi Degla in 2020 when he made his debut against El Gouna at the Egyptian Premier League.

=== Al Ahly ===
On 14 September 2022 he joined Al Ahly alongside his teammate Karim El Debes, and entered the African Squad which Al Ahly won CAF Champions League 2022–23 against Wydad AC on 13 June 2023.

=== Modern Sport ===
In January 2024 he joined Modern Sport on loan from Al Ahly alongside his teammates Mohamed Zaalouk and Kabaka.

== International career ==
Rashdan represented Egypt's under-20 side at their unsuccessful 2023 U-20 Africa Cup of Nations campaign, in which they were knocked out in the group stage, only collecting one point for a 0–0 draw with Mozambique.

== Honours and achievements ==
Al Ahly

- CAF Champions League:2022–23
