= Tomb of 'Ip =

Ancient, lost Egyptian tomb chapel

- Location within Egypt
- 29.8411°N 31.2597°E
- Location: El Saff, Middle Egypt

Site notes
- Archaeologists: Henry George Fischer
- Discovered: 1936
- Condition: Lost
- Public access: No

The Tomb of 'Ip is an ancient Egyptian tomb chapel that was discovered in 1936 in El Saff, 17 km north of Atfih in Middle Egypt. The decoration of the tomb chapel was copied in the following years, but since then the location of the tomb was lost. The records were published in 1995 by Henry George Fischer in a monograph. No plan was recorded.

The decoration of the chapel was painted. It can be assumed that the paintings decorated a tomb chapel cut into the rocks at El Saff. The left wall of the tomb chapel shows on the left, Ip and his wife are sitting in front of an offering table (the table was already destroyed when the scene was copied). His wife is called she who is known to the king, the revered one before Hathor, lady of Atfih. Her name is Menkhet Henut. Above them is a text mainly listing the titles of Ip and of his wife. In front of this was painted a long offering list, also much destroyed when found. On the far right are shown servants and fishermen in a boat. The right wall of the chapel shows Ip twice, on boats hunting in the marshes. His wife is sitting next to him at his feet on the boats. The rear wall of the chapel shows Ip standing on the right, watching servants bringing cattle and scribes recording it. The caption of the scene reads: Viewing the accounting of production.... At least the tomb chamber of the wife was painted too. She is once shown standing in front of oils. Another wall showed an offering list.

Not much is known about Ip. In the tomb chapel he bears several titles, some of them connected to the provincial administration. He seems to date to the Eleventh Dynasty, around 2000 BCE.

== Significance ==
The Tomb of 'Ip provides important insights into the art and administration of the Eleventh Dynasty of Egypt. The detailed paintings and inscriptions offer valuable information on the titles and roles of provincial officials during this period.
