= Tamha =

Administrative unit in Egypt

- Administrative unit
- Location of Tamha in Egypt
- Coordinates: 30.032021°N 31.110449°E
- Country: Egypt
- Governorate: Giza
- District: Al-Ayyat
- Time zone: UTC+2 (EET)
  - Summer (DST): UTC+3 (EEST)

Tamha (Arabic: طمها) is an administrative unit affiliated with the Al-Ayyat district in Giza Governorate, Egypt.

Tamha includes four administrative divisions:

- Tamha
- Manshat Abd El-Sayed
- Bidf
- Al-Mosanada
