= Baharia Military Railway =

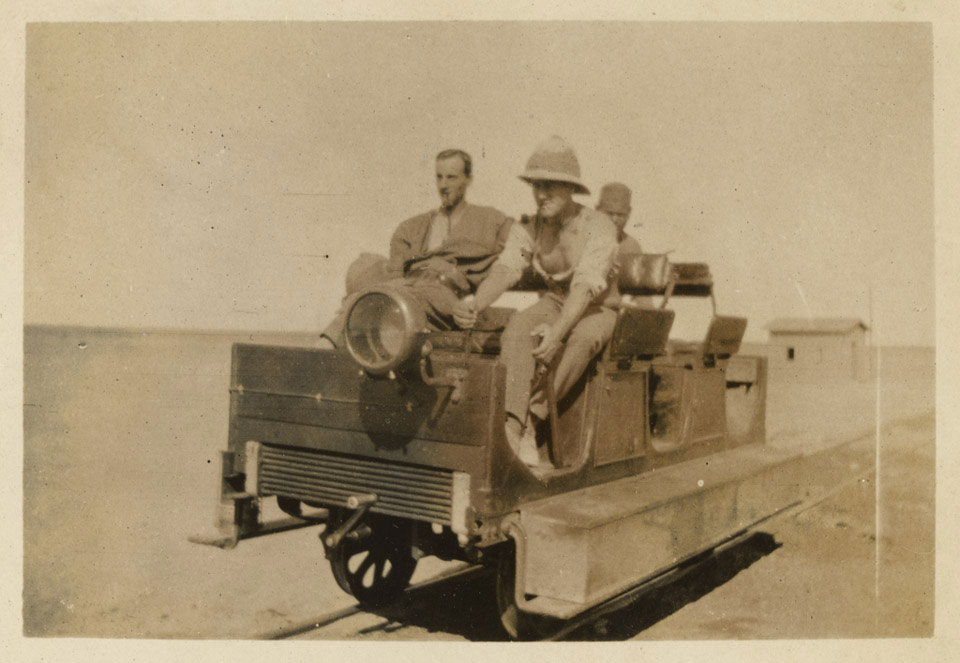
- Draisine in front of Block House B2

Technical
- Line length: 134 km (83 miles)
- Track gauge: 762 mm (2 ft 6 in) (Category 762)
- Maximum incline: 10%

The Baharia Military Railway was a 134 km (83 miles) long narrow gauge railway with a gauge of 762 mm (2 ft 6 in) in Egypt, which led from the Nile valley to the Abu-Muharriq dunes near the Bahariya Oasis.

== Track ==
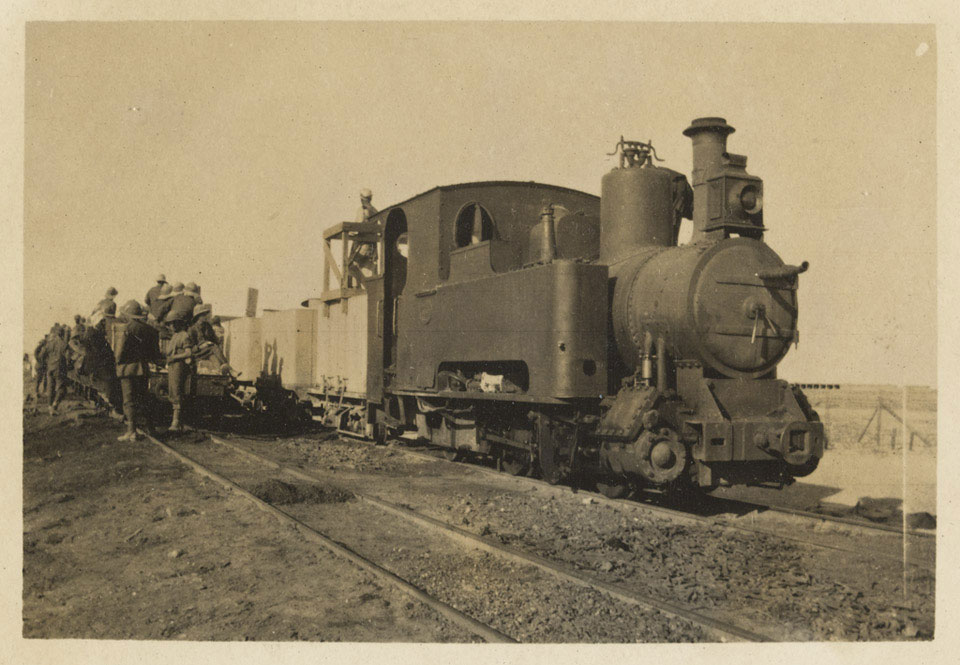
Boarding of the troops at Block House B2 towards Block House B6

Senussi troops occupied the Bahariya, Farafra, Dakhla and Kharga oases in the Western Desert of Egypt and applied pressure onto the Nile valley. As the Western Oasis Railway had been previously used successfully by British troops to re-occupy Kharga Oasis and to supply the garrison with goods, the British Army decided on 15 April 1916 to build a narrow gauge railway from Bahnassa near Samalut in the Nile valley to the Bahariya Oasis. The track ran mostly alongside the Darb-el-Rubi camel track. To keep an eye onto the traffic, six fortified Block Houses were built.

Approximately 2500 soldiers, 40 motor vehicles and not less than 4800 camels were provided to re-occupy the oasis, assuming that 800 Senussi troops were stationed there. The railway was used during the construction for transporting building materials, troops, camel feed and water. Existing rails and sleepers of other Egyptian narrow gauge railways were lifted and re-used for building the railway track.

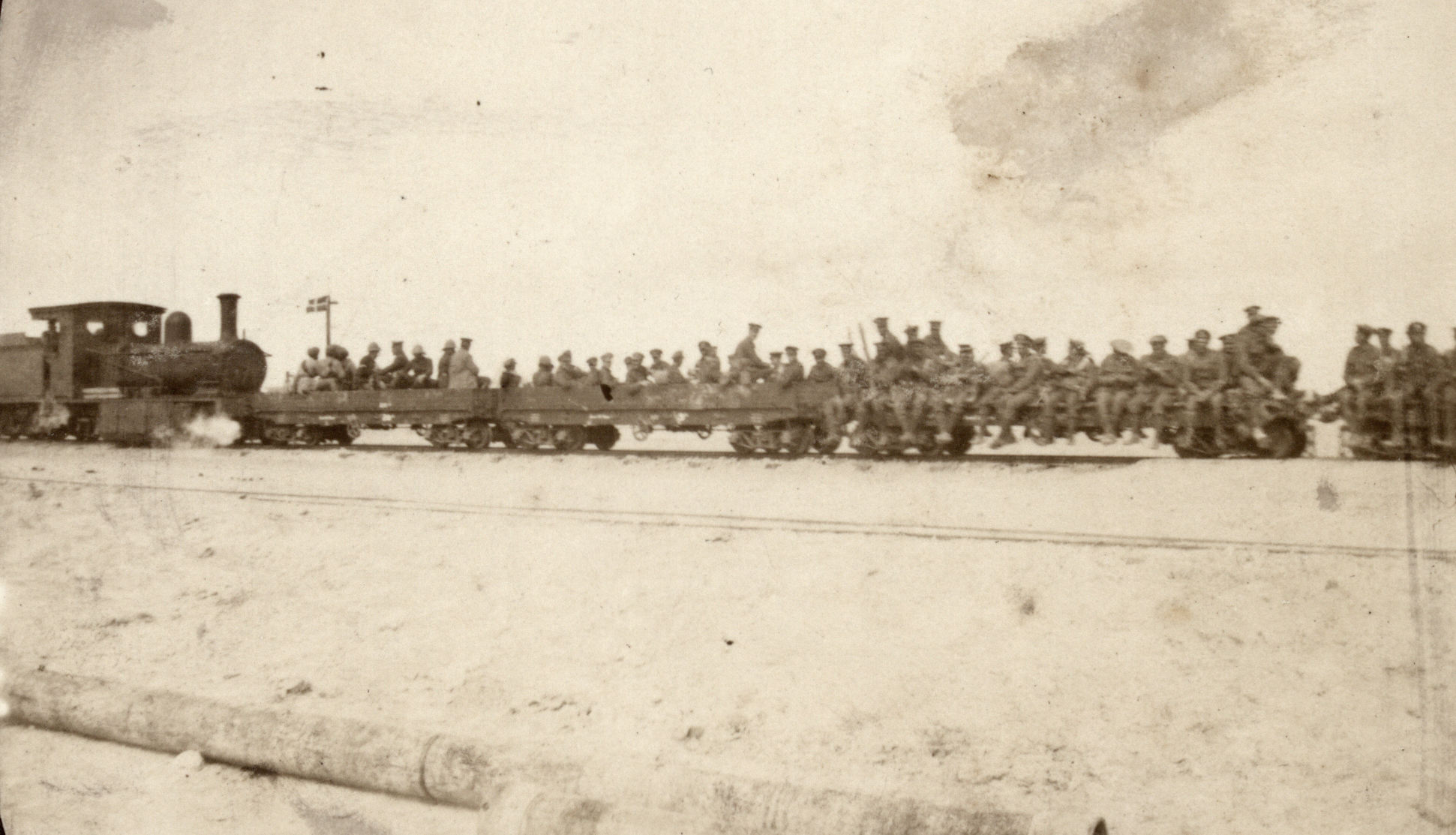
Transport of the troops, 1916

The Senussi retreated on 10 October 1916 towards the Siwa Oasis when they noted that an attack was imminent. One week later, on 16 October 1916, camel riders and light motor patrol vehicles re-occupied the oasis once again. One week later, the 134 km long track was completed on 23 October 1916. Within the 191 days of its construction, 700 m railway track have been laid per day on average. It was impossible to extend the railway any further than Block House B6 due to the Abu-Muharriq dunes, thus the track ended there. The British troops left the area in January 1917, when it became apparent that the Senussi were no longer a threat. The Block Houses B1-B5 were disassembled starting in March 1917, as they were not needed any longer. The military railway was, however, kept in operation to transport goods to the terminus at Block House 6, from where they were transported with camels and motor vehicles to the oasis. Up to 20 locomotives and 200 wagons were apparently used on the railway line. The military did not see a purpose for keeping the railway running after the end of the war in 1918, and thus it was taken out of use in 1919, although the area provided some opportunities for phosphate and iron ore mining.
