= Duaenre =

- Vizier of Egypt
Egyptian name
D21 D36 D46 N14 V4 N35Dwꜣ n Rꜥ Rꜥ
- Tenure: c. 2525 BC
- Pharaoh: Menkaure
- Burial: Giza, Giza Governorate, Egypt
- Father: Khafre
- Mother: Meresankh III

Duaenre (fl. c. 2525 BC) was a vizier under Menkaure during the Fourth Dynasty of Egypt. His titles include those of king's son of his body (za-nesut-khetef, zꜣ-nswt-ẖt.f), hereditary prince (iri-pat, jrj-pꜥt), count (hati-a, ḥꜣtj-ꜥ), vizier (tAjtj), scribe of the divine book (sesh-medjat-netjer, sš-mḏꜣt-nṯr), mouth of Nekhen (er-nekhen, r-nḫn), and mouth of every Butite (er-pe-neb, r-p-nb).

== Family ==
Dua(en)re was the son of King Khafre and queen consort Meresankh III and thus grandson of Khufu and Crown Prince Kawab. A son is shown in one of the scenes in the hall of the tomb. The vizier Babaef II was probably a son of Duaenre.

An inscription on a false door found in G 3098 (Called G 2098 by Fischer) mentions a woman named Neferhetepes-nedjes, daughter of Neferhetepes(-wer) and granddaughter of the King's son of his body Duanre. This man is most likely to be identified with prince Duaenre. And thus Neferhetepes and Neferhetepes-nedjes are a likely daughter and granddaughter of Duaenre. The false door was found in an addition to the tomb of Iymery and his wife Persenet. It is not known how Iymery was related to the family of Duaenre.

== Tomb ==
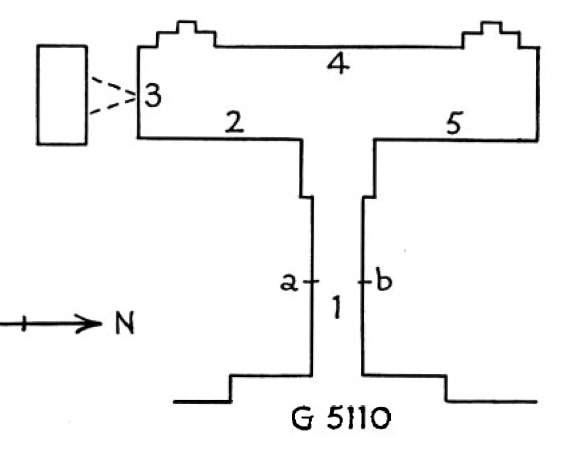
Plan of G 5110

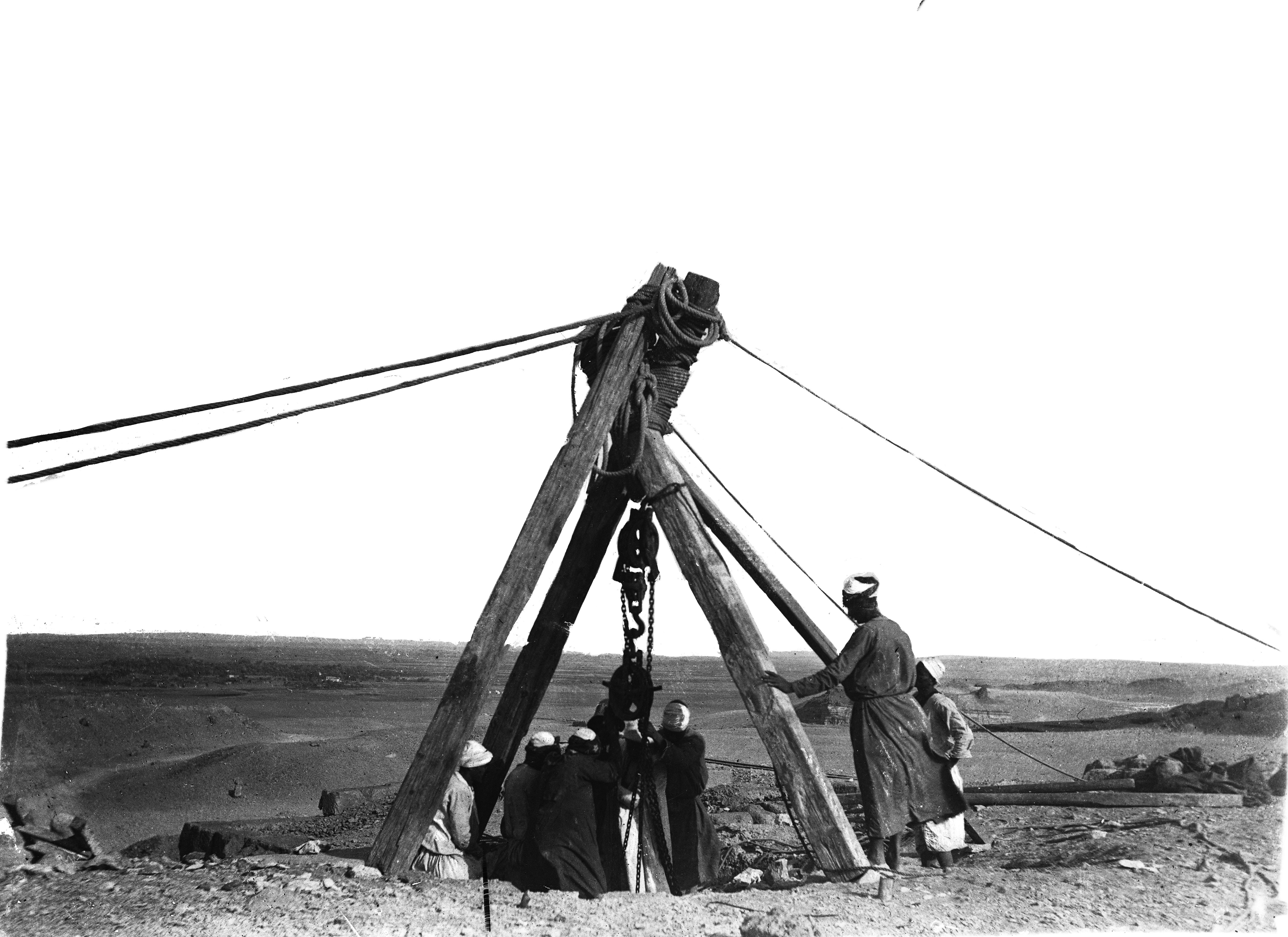
Removal of the pink granite sarcophagus from the tomb of Prince Duaenre, in the western Necropolis at Giza, conducted by the Italian Archaeological Mission (Schiaparelli excavations, 1903)

Duaenre was buried in mastaba G 5110 in Giza. The mastaba contains a passageway and a hall. Duaenre is depicted with attendant and offering texts in the passageway. The hall contains scenes showing Duaenre and attendants bringing offerings and animals. A son is depicted in a scene showing the presentation of cattle. An uninscribed red granite sarcophagus was found in the shaft in the mastaba by Ernesto Schiaparelli, and is now in the Museo Egizio of Turin.

A limestone fragment found in the debris mentions the names of Iufi and Perneb who were overseers of the gangs of tens. These men would have been the overseers of the workers crew constructing the mastaba.

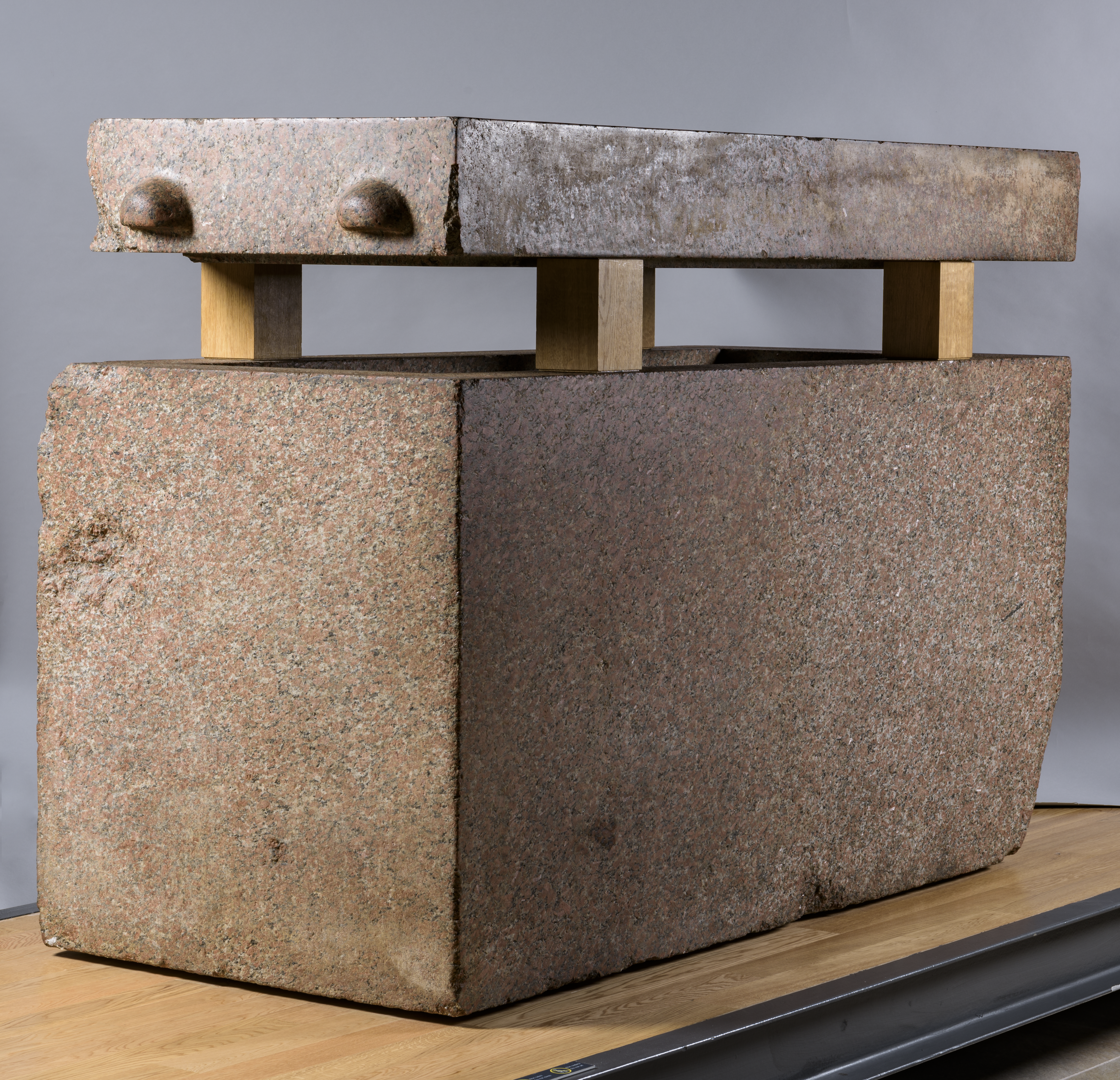
The red granite sarcophagus of Duaenre, Museo Egizio, Turin

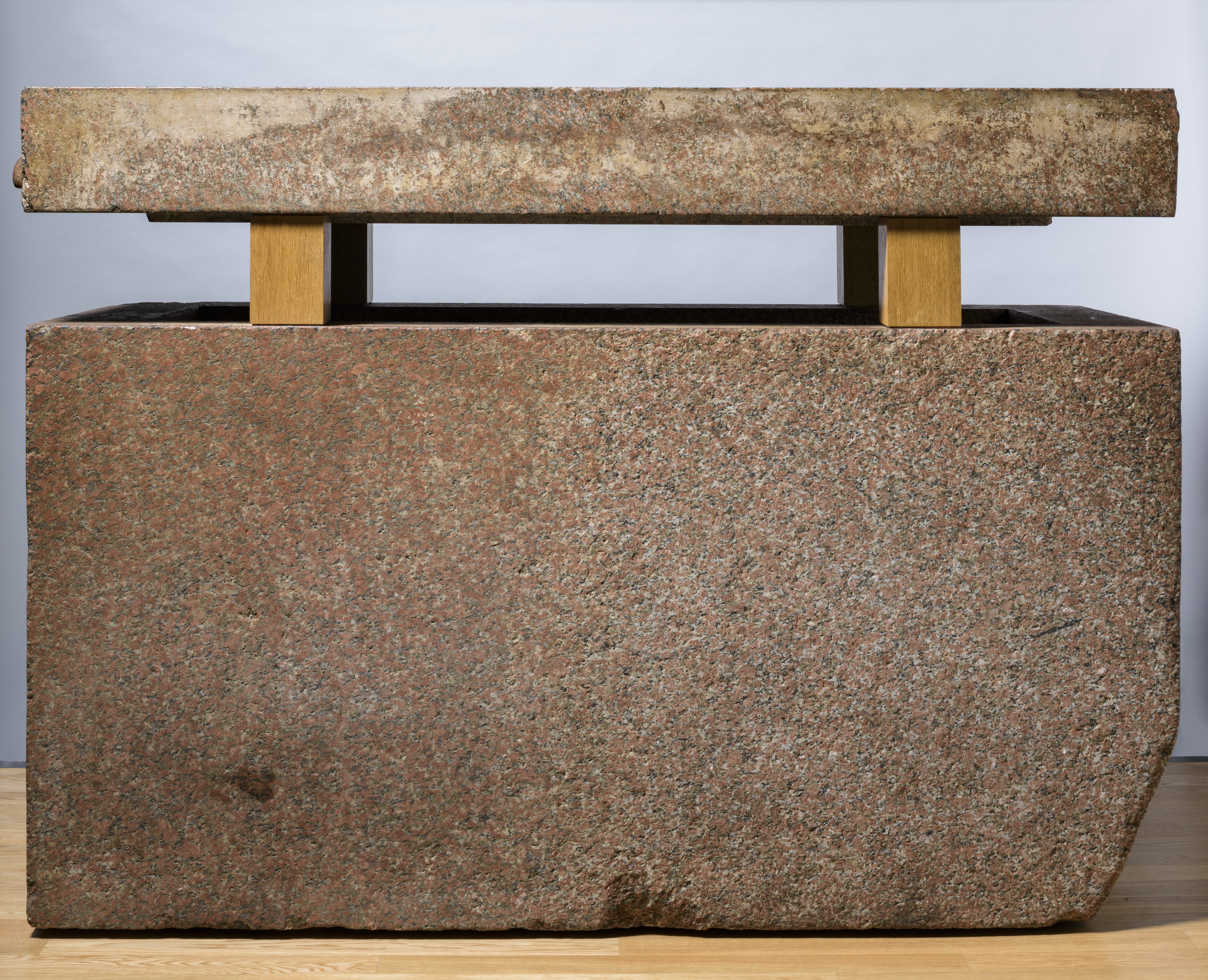

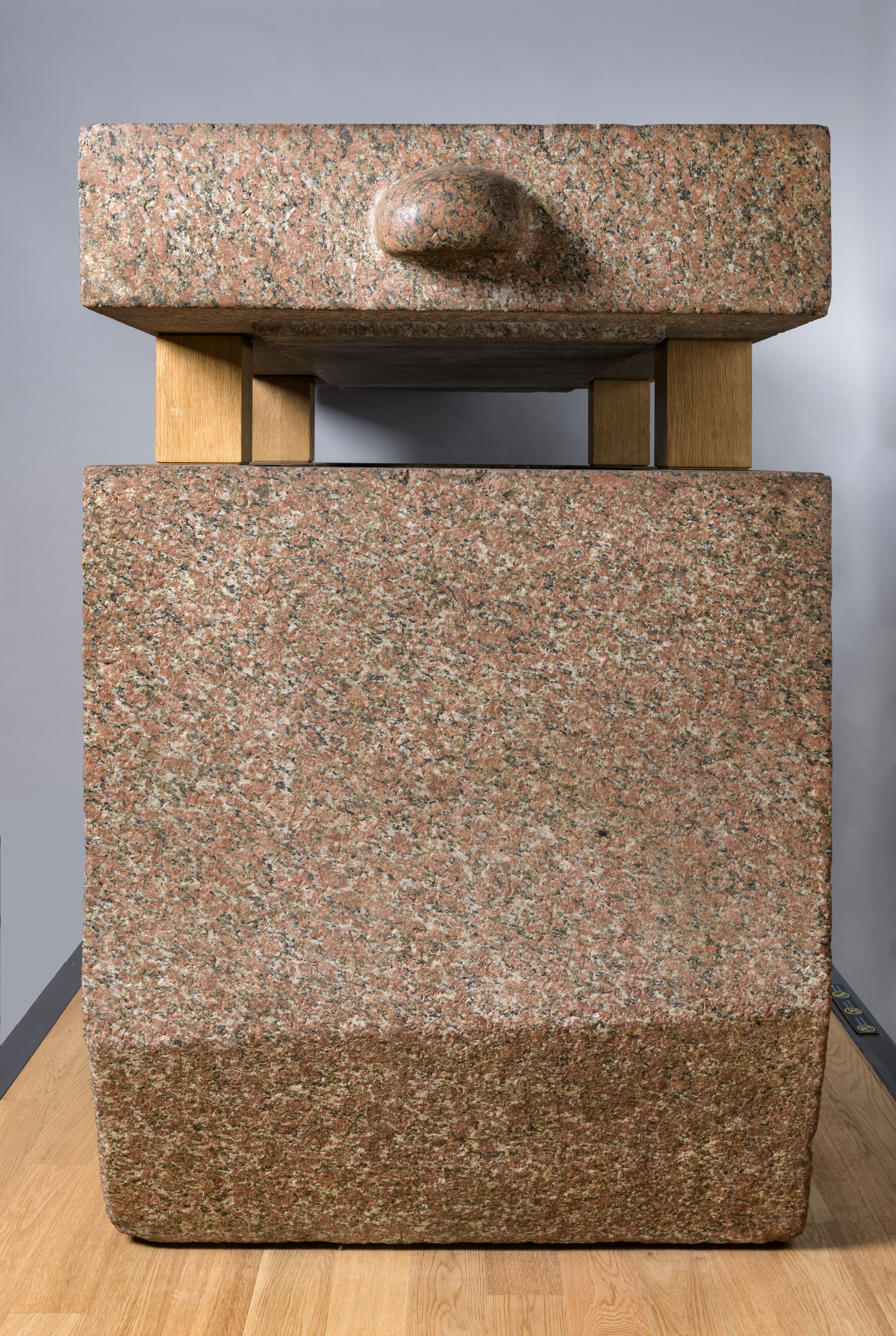

== Ancestry ==
Ancestors of Duaenre

Khufu
Khafre
Duaenre
Khufu
Kawab
Meritites I
Meresankh III
Khufu
Hetepheres II
