= Atfih =

Town in Middle Egypt

Atfih أطفيح
- Town
- Location in Egypt
- Coordinates: 29°25′N 31°15′E
- Country: Egypt
- Governorate: Giza

Population (2001)
  - Total: 106,300
- Time zone: UTC+2 (EET)
  - Summer (DST): UTC+3 (EEST)

Atfih (Arabic: أطفيح Aṭfīḥ pronounced [ʔɑtˤˈfiːħ], Coptic: ⲡⲉⲧⲡⲏϩ or ⲡⲉⲧⲡⲉϩ Tpeh or Tpēh) is a town in Middle Egypt. It was part of the now defunct Helwan Governorate from April 2008 to April 2011, after which it was reincorporated into the Giza Governorate. As of 2001, it has a population of 106,300 inhabitants.

It speaks Saʽidi Arabic

== Etymology ==
D1 Z1 E1 X1 Z2 O49
tp jhw(t)
in hieroglyphs
Era: Old Kingdom
(2686–2181 BC)

The name is derived from Ancient Egyptian Tp-jhw, meaning the first of the cows, referring to Hathor. The name became Petpeh in Coptic, from which the Arabic version Atfih (أطفيح) is derived. The city was also known in Greco-Roman Egypt as Aphroditopolis.

== Location ==
Atfih is located in the area of ancient Maten, Upper Egypt's northernmost nome.

== History ==
=== Ancient history ===
Atfih was known as Per-nebet tep-ihu in antiquity and Busiris (Aphroditopolis) to the Romans. Some of the Ancient Egyptian monuments discovered in the town include an animal necropolis, Greco-Roman tombs, and sepulchers of cows in huge limestone tombs. About 17 km North was found the Tomb of 'Ip, who lived around 2000 BC. in Atfih.

==== Hesateum ====
"Hesateum" (in analogy of the "Serapeaum" at Saqqara") was a necropolis of sacred cows of the goddess Hesat. Sixteen animal tombs of the Ptolemaic Period have survived.

=== Modern history ===
On 1 March 2011, the town's core in Atfih saw skirmishes between some Muslim and Christian people because of an alleged affair between a young Coptic Christian and a Muslim girl. When some people tried to blame the girl's father, a brawl started and ended by killing the girl's father and one of his relatives. An outrage arose on March 4 and Muslims of the town went to the church of the two martyrs and set it on fire. Hence on March 8, the Christians demonstrated in front of Maspiro television building demanding that the church should be built in the same place and Christians should be returned to their homes in the town safely. Prime Minister Essam Sharaf visited them to calm the situation and the priest Mtawos Wahba has been released. The Supreme Council of the Armed Forces pledged to rebuild the church. Some of religious, political and public figures have intervened to calm the situation, including the Islamic scholar Sheikh Mohamed Hassan, and the Islamic preacher Amr Khaled.

== See also ==
- Timeline of the 2011 Egyptian revolution since the resignation of Mubarak
