= Busiris (Aphroditopolis) =

Busiris (Aphroditopolis) أطفيح Atfih
- ruins
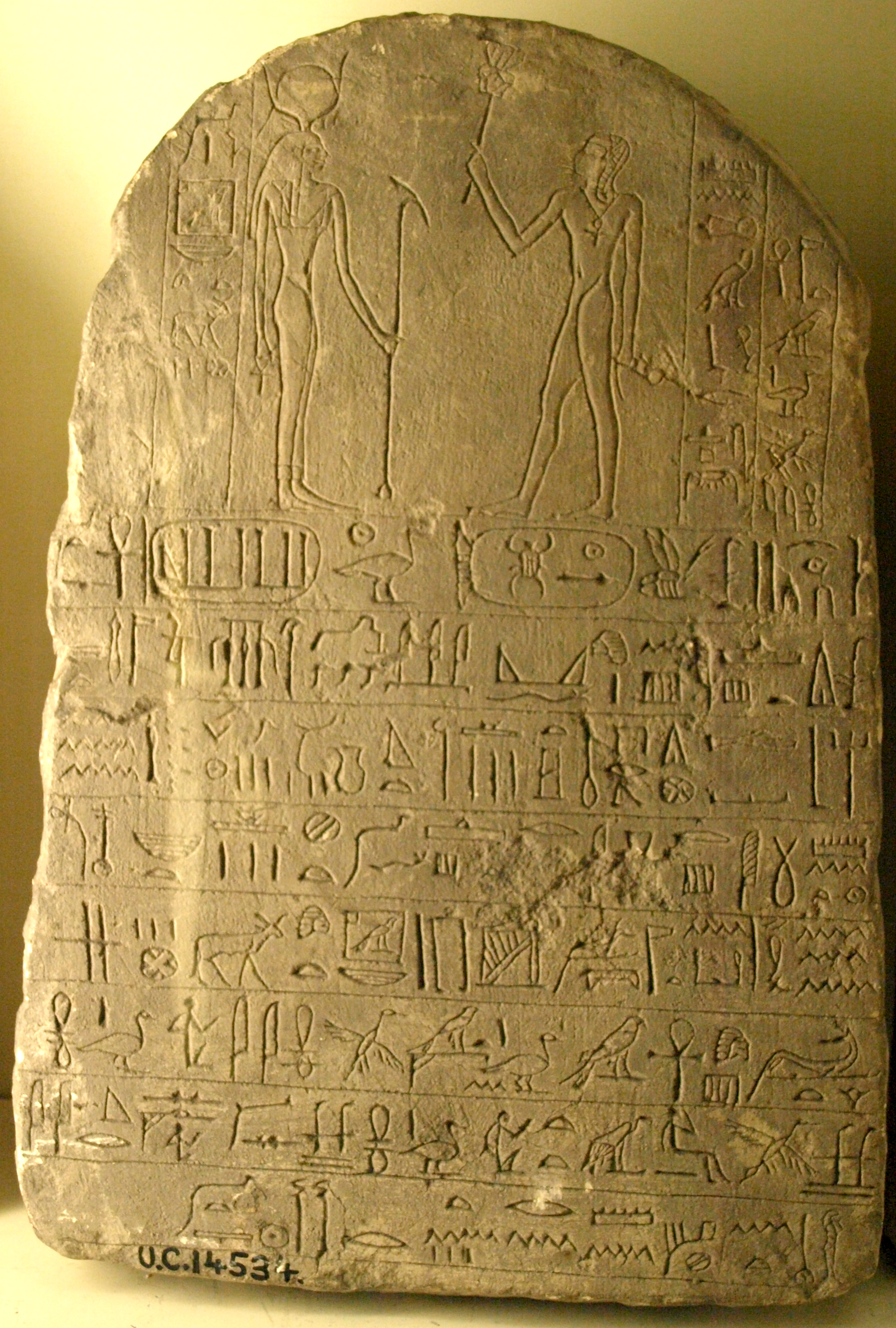
- Limestone stele of Ankhhor son of Pimay son of Pasherienmut son of Nesmin. The stela is dated in regnal Year 22 of pharaoh Shoshenq V of the 22nd Dynasty and depicts the deceased Ankhhor with the goddess Hathor.
- Nickname: Tpyhwt
- Location in Egypt
- Coordinates: 29°25′N 31°15′E
- Country: Egypt
- Governorate: Cairo
- Time zone: UTC+2 (EST)
  - Summer (DST): +3

Busiris (Greek: Βούσιρις) or Aphroditopolis was an ancient city of Middle Egypt, in the Aphroditopolite nome, on the west bank of the Nile, southwest of Aphroditopolis (the modern city of Atfih).

== Location ==
Aphroditopolis is located 38 miles upstream from Cairo, near the ruins of Memphis, Egypt. All that remains of the city is mounds and ruins, which were excavated by Matthew Flinders Petrie.

== History ==
The city was known as Tpyhwt during pharaonic times, Βούσιρις (Busiris) in Hellenistic times, Aphroditopolis during the Byzantine and Roman Empires, Petpeh in Coptic, and since the Islamic conquest as Atfih.

Under the Ptolemaic dynasty was the seat of the Aphroditopolis Nome and under the Romans was also seat of former bishopric, in Roman province Arcadia Aegypti. Known bishops include:

- Chysaorius of Aphroditopolis
- Issac of Aphroditopolis fl.1183 (Latin)
- Jacob, Bishop of Aphroditopolis fl.1020s
- Father Zosima el-Antony(Orthodox)

It remains today a vacant titular see.
