= Arab El-Hasar Bahriya =

Village in Giza Governorate, Egypt

Arab Al-Hasar عرب الحصار
- Village
- Location of Arab Al-Hasar in Egypt
- Coordinates: 29°36′0″N 31°19′0″E
- Country: Egypt
- Governorate: Giza
- Center: El-Saf
- Administrative unit: Al-Aqwas

Population (2006)
  - Total: 13,371
- Time zone: UTC+2 (EET)
  - Summer (DST): UTC+3 (EEST)

Arab Al-Hasar (Arabic: عرب الحصار) is a village affiliated with the Al-Aqwas administrative unit, located in the El-Saf Center of the Giza Governorate, Egypt.

According to the 2006 population census by the Central Agency for Public Mobilization and Statistics (CAPMAS), the total population of Arab Al-Hasar was 13,371, including 6,710 males and 6,661 females.

== See also ==
- El-Saf
