= Abu El Numrus =

Abu El Numrus ⲡⲟⲛⲙⲟⲛⲣⲟⲥ
- city
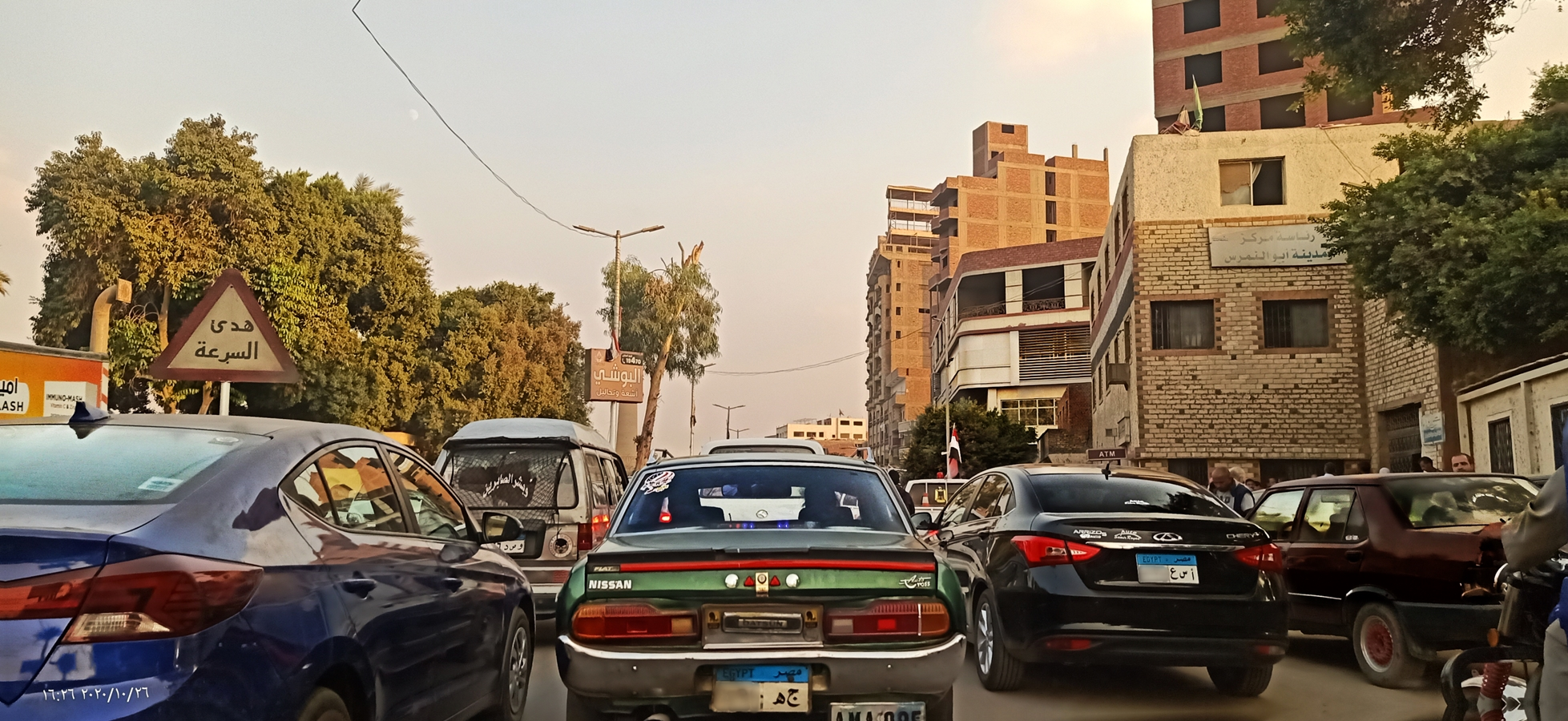

- Location in Egypt
- Coordinates: 29.953883°N 31.221701°E
- Country: Egypt
- Governorate: Giza

Area
  - Total: 6.51 km^{2} (2.51 sq mi)

Population (2023)
  - Total: 88,401
  - Density: 13,600/km^{2} (35,200/sq mi)
- Demonym(s): Numrusi (Male, Arabic: نُمرسي) Numrusiyah (Female, Arabic: نُمرسية)
- Time zone: UTC+2 (EET)
  - Summer (DST): UTC+3 (EEST)

Abu El Numrus (Arabic: أبو النمرس) is a city in the Giza Governorate, Egypt. Its population was estimated at 88,401 people in 2023.

The old name of the city in Bunumrus (Arabic: بونومروس, from Coptic: ⲡⲟⲛⲙⲟⲛⲣⲟⲥ).

== Notable people ==
- Abdelrahman Rashdan, footballer
