= Babaef II =

Ancient Egyptian vizier

Babaef
- Vizier of Egypt
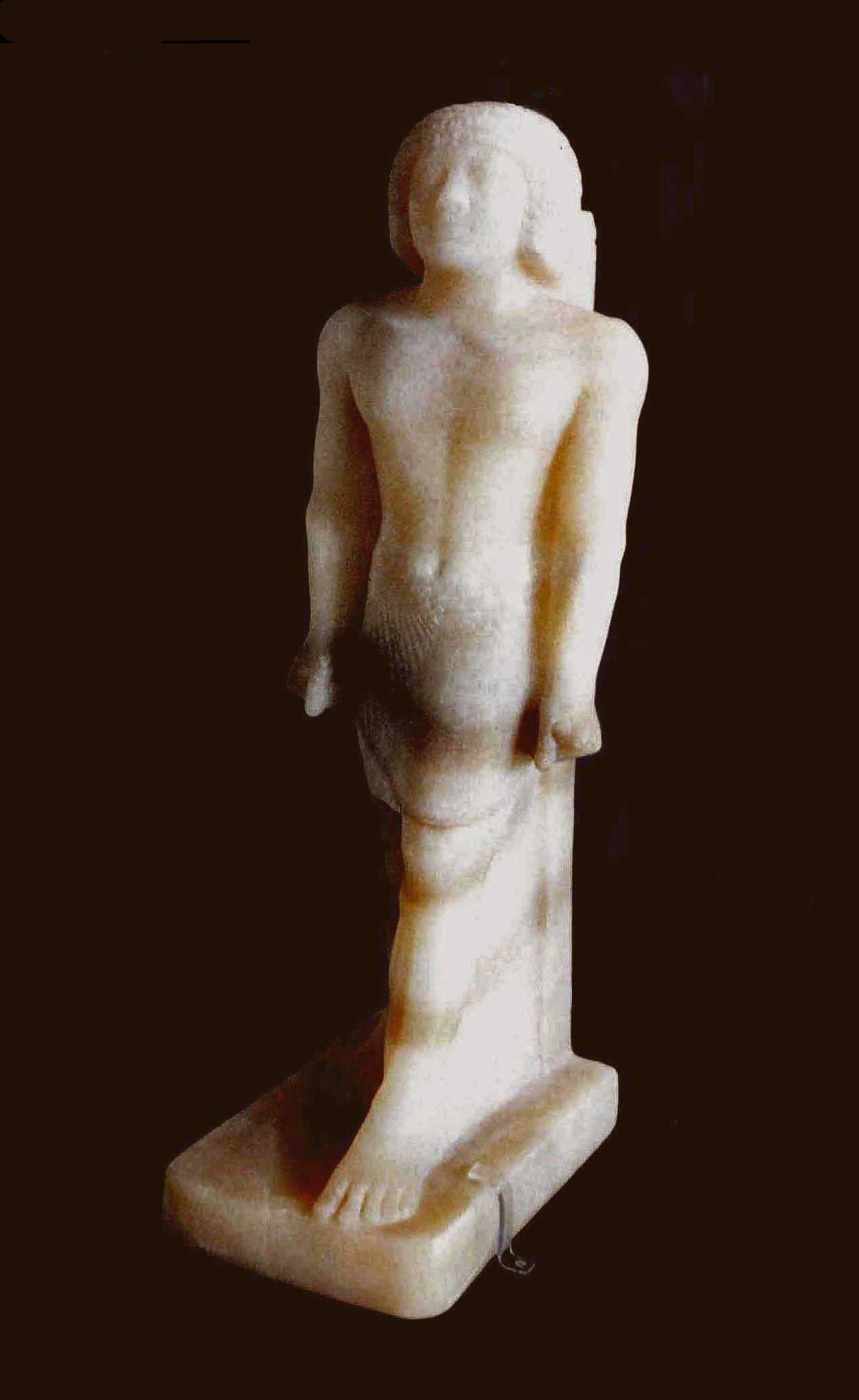
- Alabaster statuette of Babaef from his Tomb G 5230 on the Giza plateau. Now in the Kunsthistorisches Museum, Inv. 7785.
- Tenure: c. 2500 BC
- Pharaoh: Shepseskaf
- Burial: Tomb G5230, Giza, Egypt

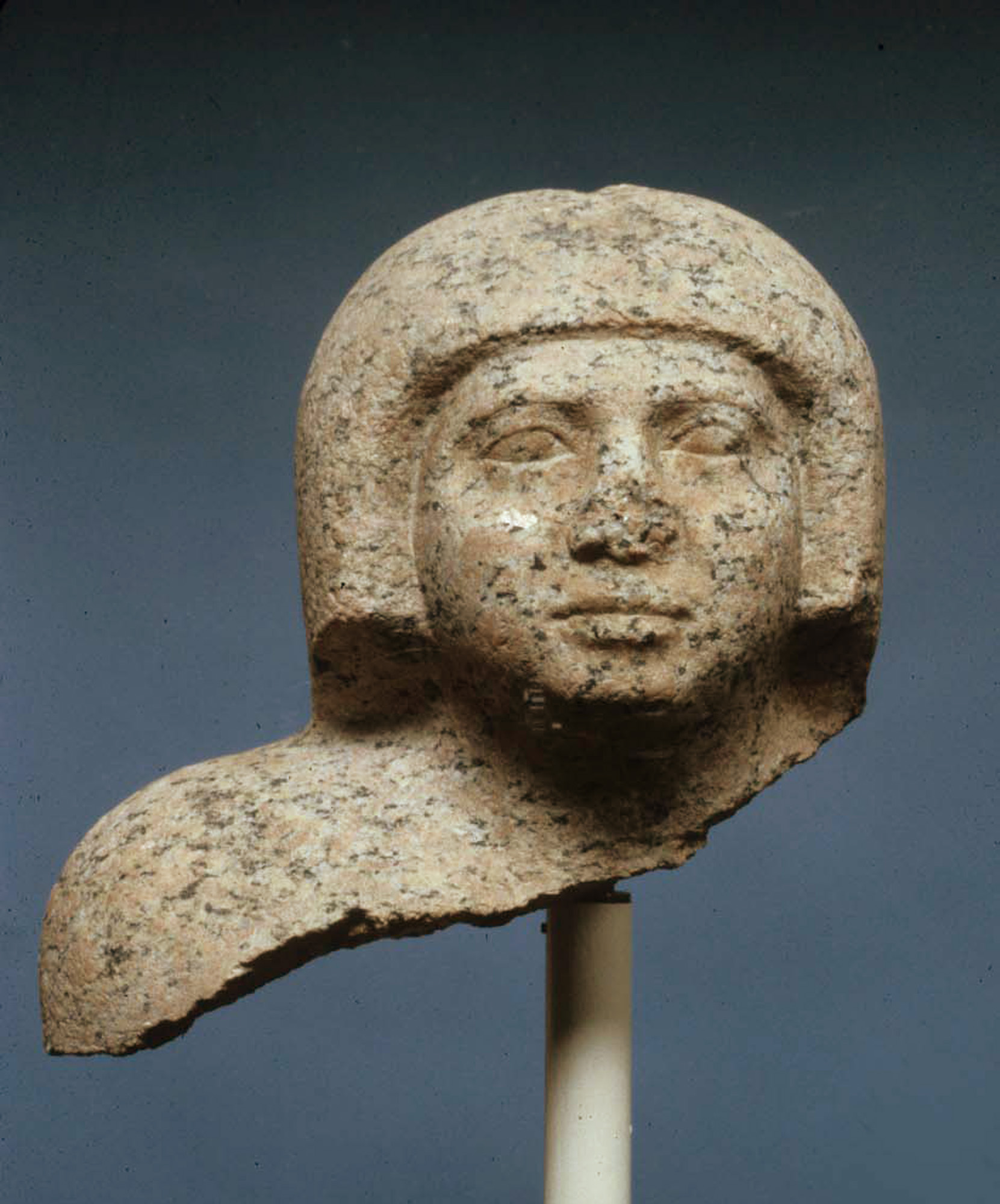
Head, male statue, perhaps Babaef

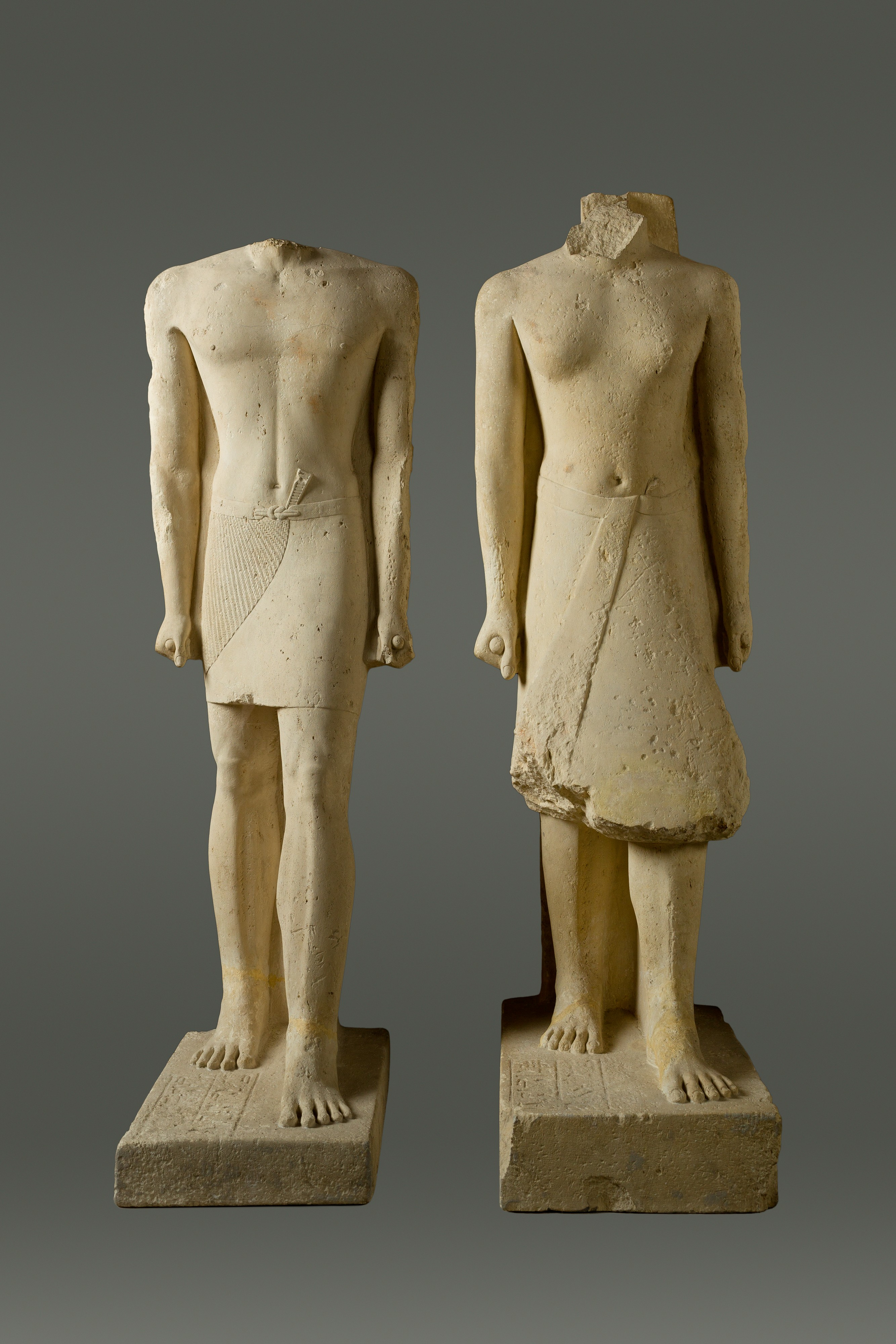
Statue, Babaef as younger man

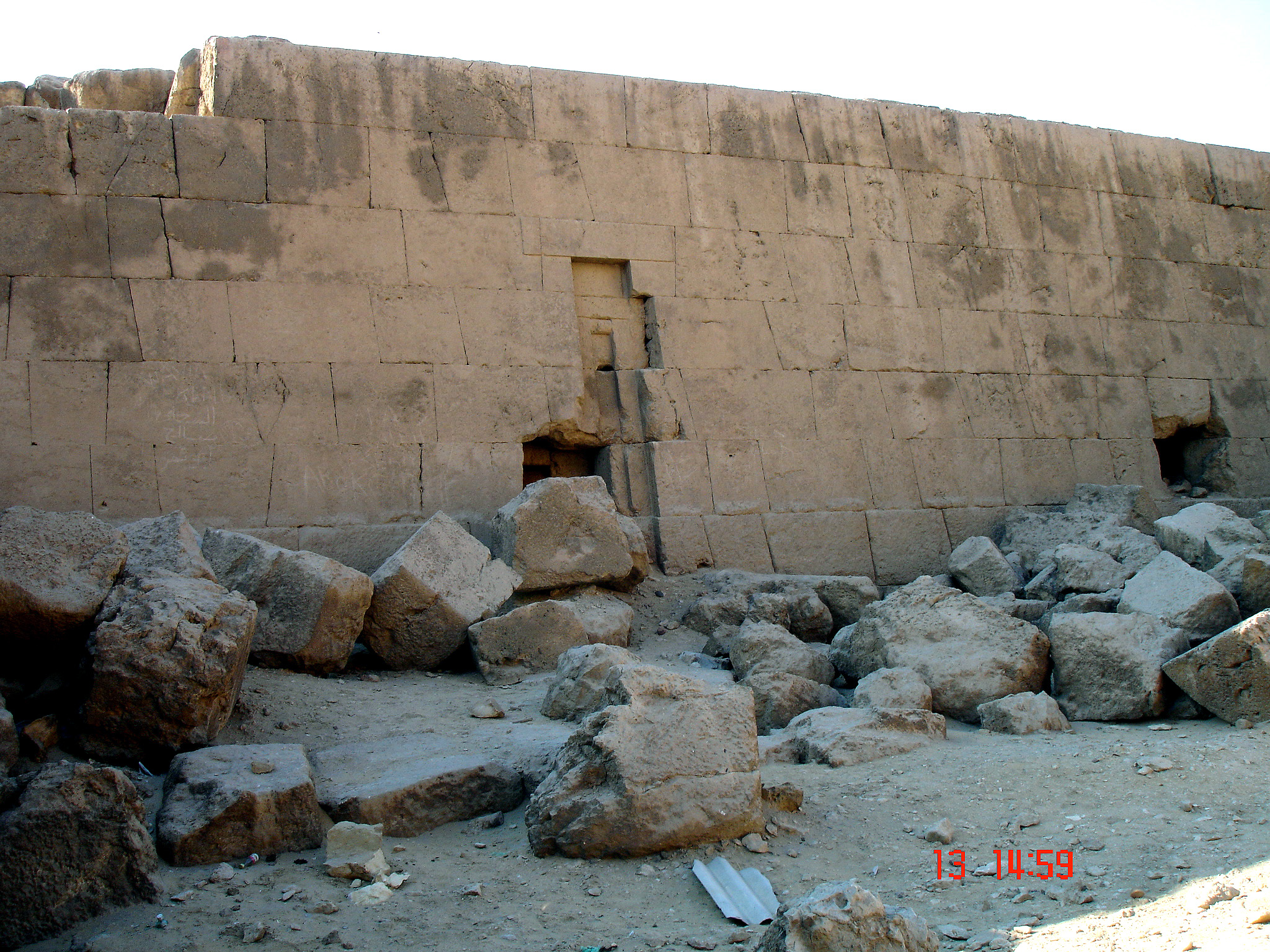
Facade of the tomb of Babaef, vizier of Shepseskaf, tomb G5230 in Giza.

Babaef (also known as Khnumbaf; fl. c. 2500 BC) was a vizier from the late Fourth Dynasty of Egypt. He was likely the son of the vizier Duaenre and hence a grandson of Khafre. He served as vizier during the reign of his cousin Shepseskaf.

== Tomb ==
The tomb of Babaef is known as G 5230 (LG 40). In the tomb, Babaef is described as a "king's son of his body, hereditary prince, count, sole companion, overseer of all royal works, director of the palace, chief justice and vizier, chief lector-priest, priest of Horus of Tehenu (Libya), elevated of arm, great of censing, servant of the throne, priest of the akes-ornament, priest of Hepwy, priest of Horus-Shewa(?), secretary of the sacred writings, elder of the snwt house, khet-priest of the Great One."

The tomb was excavated in 1914 and several large limestone statues were found in the serdab. During the excavations, many more statue fragments were found scattered to the west of the tomb. The materials included granite, diorite, and alabaster. The fragments could be identified as belonging to Babaef due to inscriptions found. Many of the statues were headless but eventually at least some of the statues could be reconstructed.
