= Valley of the Golden Mummies =

Archaeological site in the Western Desert of Egypt

Coordinates: 28.3268°N 28.8261°E

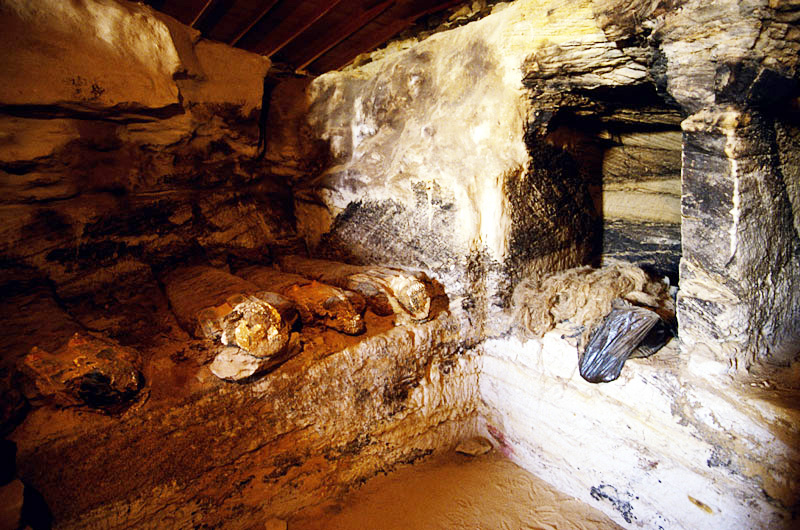
Rear and side wall of the tomb Nr. 54, Valley of the Golden Mummies, el-Bahriya, Libyan desert, Egypt.

The Valley of the Golden Mummies is a large burial site at Bahariya Oasis in the Western Desert of Egypt, dating to the Greco-Roman period. Discovered in 1996 by Zahi Hawass and his Egyptian team, approximately two hundred fifty mummies approximately two thousand years old were recovered over the period of several seasons. Eventually, the excavator further estimated a total of more than ten thousand mummies.

== Overview ==
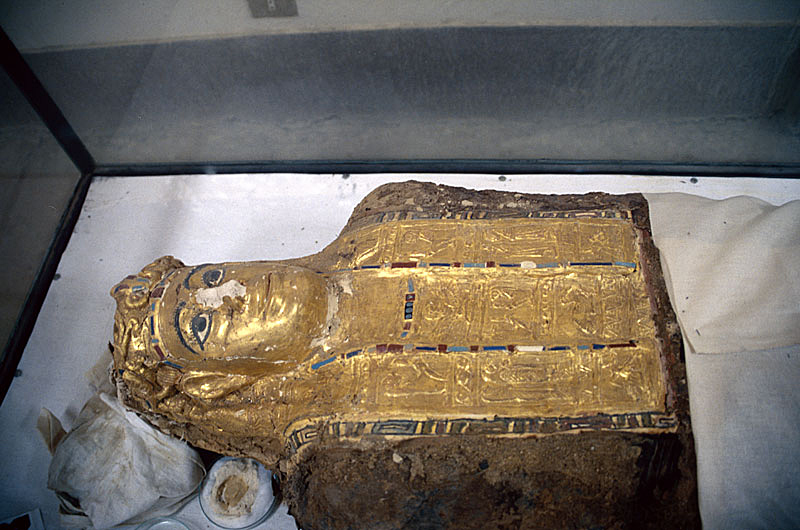
Mummy found in the Valley of the Golden Mummies, now in el-Bawiti museum, el-Bahriya, Libyan desert, Egypt.

Many of the mummies were still in good condition when they were discovered by Hawass and his team. They were decorated in different styles. There were four general styles of the mummies at Bahariya. The first style, which was found on approximately sixty mummies, has a gilded mask covering the face and a gilded waistcoat depicting different scenes of gods and goddesses across the chest. The second style is covered with cartonnage, depicting scenes of gods such as Anubis, the god of mummification, and his four children. The third style was not decorated with gold or cartonnage, but rather was placed inside an anthropoid, a pottery coffin. The fourth style was covered in linen.

Artifacts had been buried with each mummy. Some examples include jewelry bracelets, pottery of food trays, wine jars, and Ptolemaic coins. The mummies found in the tombs in the Bahariya Oasis during the Roman period show that people during this period were wealthy because they were able to afford gilding and cartonnage depicting beautiful scenes. Each mummy is different with the various styles and artifacts representing each individual. Dr. Zahi Hawass notes "it would seem that workshops were everywhere and artisans were one of the main professions in Baharyia" during this time. The population in Egypt during the Roman period was about 7 million. Therefore, Dr. Hawass believed that approximately 30,000 people inhabited Baharyia. The production of wine from dates and grapes was the main industry in Bahariya, contributing to the wealth of its people.

== Mummification ==
Mummification during the period peaked. Dr. Hawass states that the “important point about mummification is that they started to put sticks made of reeds on the right and left side of the mummy to cover the mummy with linen. This method made the mummy very stable and can last longer than the mummies of the Pharaonic period”. The preparation of the mummies began in a workshop called the “Wabt”. The god Anubis was supposed to watch the entire process. According to Egyptian religious beliefs, the hearts of those who are deceased were placed on a scale. The feather of the goddess of truth, "Maat" was placed on the other side of the scale opposite of the heart. If the feather and heart did not balance each other on the scale, there would be a huge animal waiting to eat the deceased. If the scale was balanced, the god Horus would take the deceased to meet the god Osiris and goddess Isis. Those who had died will enjoy the life in the land or field of paradise of the Egyptians.
