= Bawiti =

el-Bawiti ⲡⲁⲩⲏⲧ الباويطي
- Town
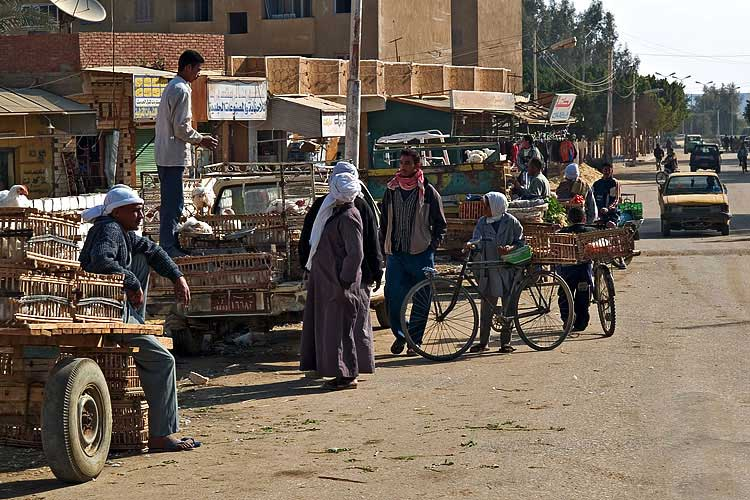

- Location in Egypt
- Coordinates: 28°21′N 28°52′E
- Country: Egypt
- Governorate: Giza

Area
  - Total: 44.4 km^{2} (17.1 sq mi)
- Elevation: 130 m (430 ft)

Population (2023)
  - Total: 15,978
  - Density: 360/km^{2} (932/sq mi)
- Time zone: UTC+2 (EET)
  - Summer (DST): UTC+3 (EEST)

El-Bawiti (Arabic: الباويطي, al-Bāwīṭī, from Coptic: ⲡⲁⲩⲏⲧ, lit. 'assembly, monastery') is a town in the Western desert in Egypt. With 15,978 inhabitants, it is the largest settlement in the Bahariya Oasis.

== The tombs of Qarat Qasr Salim hill ==
On a low ridge overlooking El-Bawiti are a pair of nicely decorated underground tombs of the 26th Dynasty, a high time in Bahariya Oasis. The tombs, belonging to the wealthy local merchants Zed-Amun-ef-Ankh and his son Banentiu, have an inner court with 4 columns and up to 7 side chambers.

The tomb of Zed-Amun-ef-Ankh has colorful pictures of the gods carrying out the mortuary rituals. The ceiling is painted with a starry sky. The columns of the tomb of Banentiu are painted with images of deities and the ceiling has a winged sun-disk. The walls by the entrance show the journeys of the Moon and the Sun.

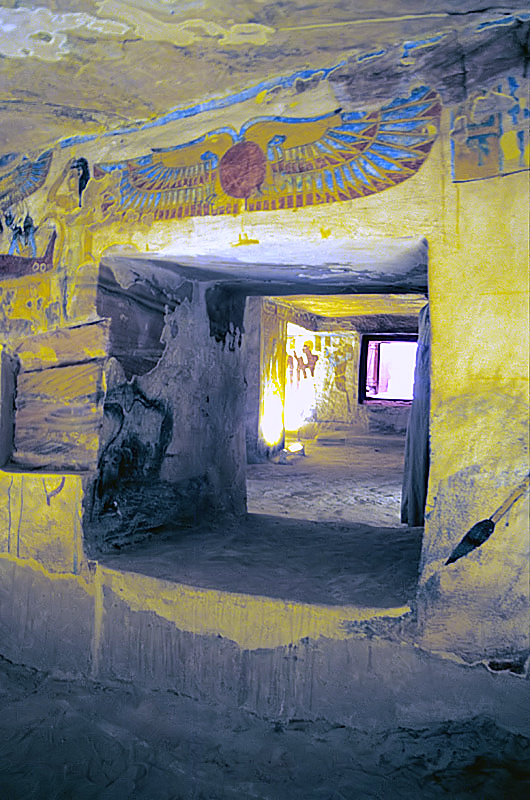
Entrance of Baennentiu's tomb

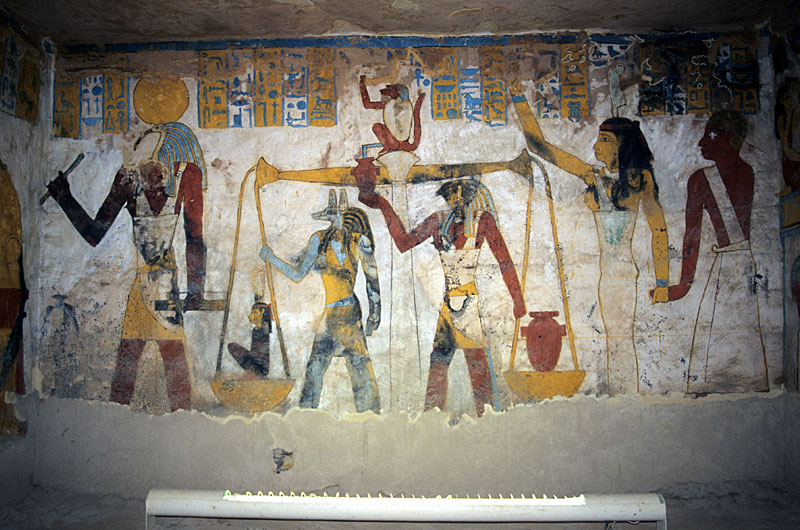
Justice scene: tomb owner Baennentiu conducted by Maat, Anubis and Horus with scales
