= El Saff =

El Saff الصف
- City
- Location in Egypt
- Coordinates: 29.577222°N 31.290556°E
- Country: Egypt
- Governorate: Giza

Population (2018)
  - Total: 59,348
- Time zone: UTC+2 (EET)
  - Summer (DST): UTC+3 (EEST)

El Saff (Arabic: الصف) is a city in the Giza Governorate, Egypt. Its population was estimated at 59,000 people in 2018.

== Background ==
El Saff is a Markaz and city located about 30 km south of Helwan, which includes more than 30 villages, and it follows the Giza Governorate, although it is located on the eastern bank of the Nile River, opposite Al-Ayyat B center. To the west is the Nile River, and from the east is the Eastern desert. The city is known for the clay brick factories that spread widely over the area and the villages of Askar, Al-Wadi, and Abu Abu Sa’id.

The most famous cities in El Saff Markaz:

- El Saff El Balad village
- Ghamza AL Kubra village
- Al Akhsas village
- El Shobak El Sharqy village
- Kafr Tarchan village
- Askar village
- El Wadi village
- Al Aquas wel Fahmyen village
- Nazlet El Eryan village
- El Shorfa village
- El Desmy village

Most of the villages and areas of the center are located to the east and west of the desert road to Upper Egypt, which connects the center to Upper Egypt, Cairo and Helwan. The army also made a road over the markaz about 15 km connecting the center to Cairo, the ring road and the highway over Cairo. According to tradition, the Prophet Moses was born in the village of Askar.
