= Bahariya Oasis =

Bahariya Oasis: الواحات البحرية (Egyptian Arabic); ϯⲟⲩⲁϩ mⲡⲉⲙϫⲉ (Coptic)
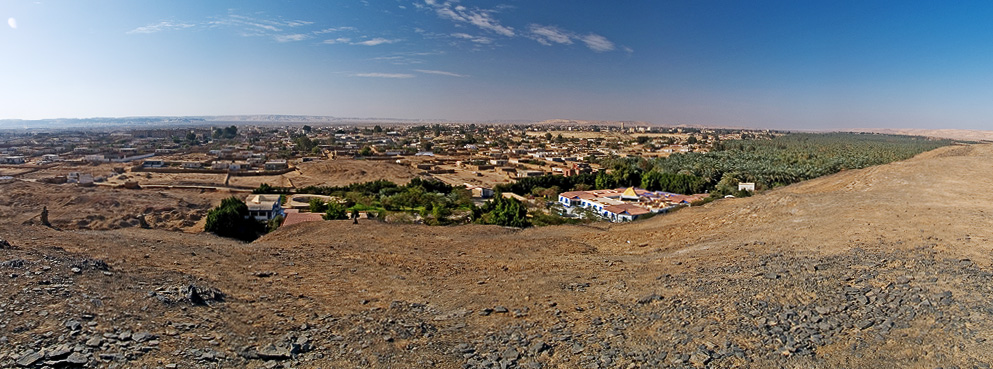
- View of Bahariya Oasis from Black Mountain

- Location in Egypt
- Coordinates: 28°21′5.36″N 28°51′44.6″E
- Country: Egypt
- Governorate: Giza Governorate

Population (2006)
  - Total: 32,815
- Time zone: UTC+2 (EET)
  - Summer (DST): UTC+3 (EEST)

Bahariya Oasis (Egyptian Arabic: الواحات البحرية, romanized: El-Wāḥāt El-Baḥrīya, "the Northern Oases") is a depression and a naturally rich oasis in the Western Desert of Egypt. It is approximately 370 km away from Cairo. The roughly oval valley extends from northeast to southwest, has a length of 94 km, a maximum width of 42 km and covers an area of about 2000 km^{2}.

The valley is surrounded by mountains and has numerous springs. Located in Giza Governorate, the main economic sectors are agriculture, iron ore mining, and tourism. The main agricultural products are guavas, mangos, dates, and olives.

== Names ==
w Aa2 t T14 xAst	t N21	A40

wḥꜣt mḥt
"The Northern Oasis"
in hieroglyphs

In Ancient Egypt, the oasis had two names. The name 'ḏsḏs' (Djesdjes) is first mentioned on a scarab dating back to the Middle Kingdom. In the New Kingdom, this name is rarely found, although it does appear for example in the Temple of Luxor and in the account of King Kamose, who occupied the oasis during the war against the Hyksos. From the 25th Dynasty, it was almost the only name used. Another name wḥꜣt mḥtt ("the Northern Oasis") was almost exclusively used in the New Kingdom; it appears for instance on the local grave of Amenhotep, and is found again in the list of oases in the Temple at Edfu.

From 45 CE, the depression was known in Latin as Oasis parva (Small Oasis). The Greek historian Strabo called it the "Second Oasis", and the 5th century CE historian Olympiodorus of Thebes called it "the Third Oasis".

In Coptic times, it was known as the "Oasis of Oxyrhynchus" (Coptic: ϯⲟⲩⲁϩ `ⲙⲡⲉⲙϫⲉ Diwah Ēmbemdje) or Tast(s) (Coptic: ⲧⲁⲥⲧ(ⲥ)), which is derived from Ancient Egyptian ḏsḏs. After the Islamization of Egypt, it was called the Oasis of Bahnasa, "Oasis of Oxyrhynchus".

The modern name is الواحات البحرية, al-Wāḥāt al-Baḥriyya meaning "the Northern Oases". The southern part of the depression around El Heiz apparently never had a separate name.

== Towns ==
Bahariya consists of many villages, of which El Bawiti is the largest and the administrative center. Qasr is el-Bawiti's neighboring/twin village. To the east, about ten kilometers away are the villages of Mandishah and el-Zabu. A smaller village called el-'Aguz lies between El Bawiti and Mandishah. Harrah, the easternmost village, is a few kilometers east of Mandishah and el-Zabu. El Heiz, also called El-Hayez, is the southernmost village, but it may not always be considered part of Bahariya because it is so far from the rest of the villages, about 50 kilometers south of El Bawiti. There is an oasis at El-Hayez where mummies have been found on which genetic studies have been conducted.

== History ==
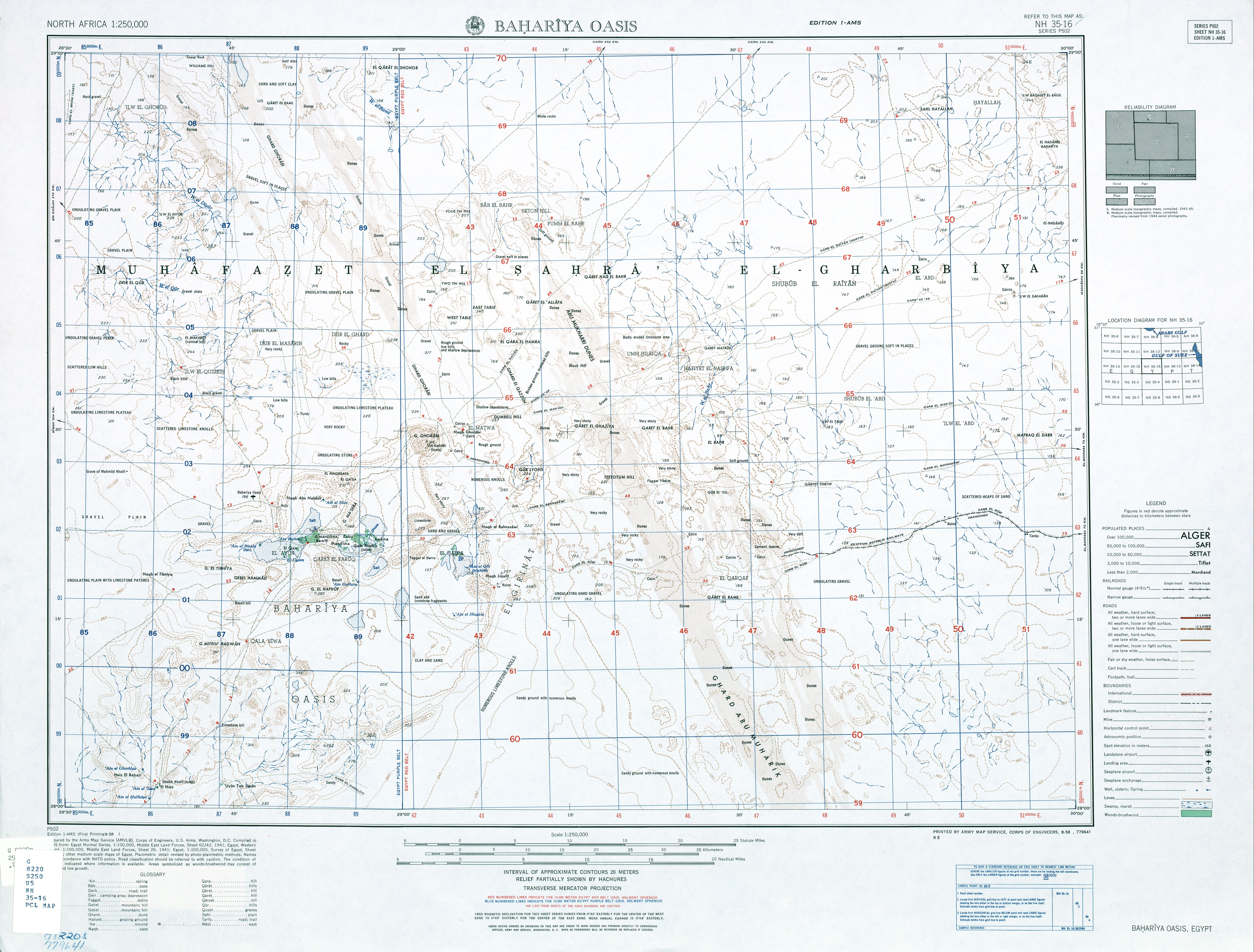
Map sheet showing Bahariya Oasis

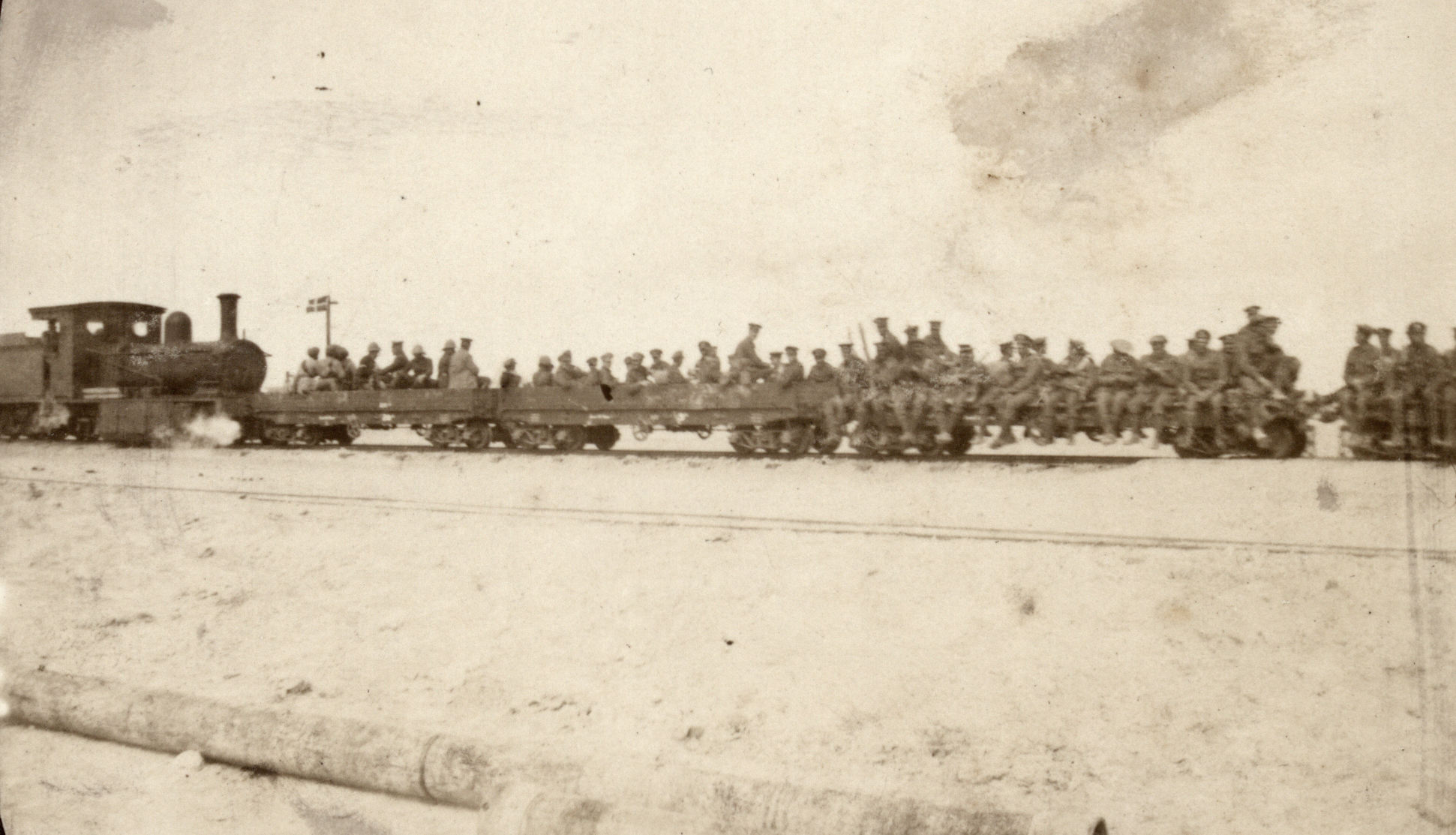
Transport of troops on the Baharia Military Railway, 1916

The depression has been populated since the Neolithic, although archaeological evidence is not continuous. In El Heiz, a prehistoric settlement site of hunter-gatherers was found with remains of grindstones, arrowheads, scrapers, chisels, and ostrich eggshells. In Qārat el-Abyaḍ, a Czech team led by Miroslav Bárta discovered a settlement of the Old Kingdom. Rock inscriptions in el-Harrah and other records date to the Middle Kingdom and upwards. The tomb of Amenhotep called Huy was erected in Qarat Hilwah at the end of the 18th dynasty. In the 26th dynasty, the depression was culturally and economically flourishing. This can be learned from the chapels in 'Ain el-Muftilla, the tombs in Qārat Qasr Salim and Qarat esh-Sheikh Subi, and the site of Qasr 'Allam.

The Greco-Roman period was a time of prosperity. There is the ruin of a temple dedicated to Ammon by Alexander the Great located in Qasr el-Miqisba ('Ain et-Tibniya). It is believed by some Egyptologists that Alexander passed through Bahariya while returning from the oracle of Ammon at Siwa Oasis. Excavations of the Greco-Roman necropolis found in 1995 and known as the Valley of the Golden Mummies began in 1999. Approximately thirty-four tombs have been excavated from this area. In Roman times, a big military fort was erected at Qarat el-Toub.

During World War I, the Baharia Military Railway was built to provide access to the oasis. In the early 1970s, an asphalt road connecting Bahariya to Cairo was finished. With the new road came electricity, cars, television, phone lines, a more accessible route to Cairo, and, more recently, internet. The spread of people and ideas between Bahariya and Cairo has increased dramatically since the road was constructed. Also, the language of the Waḥātī people has changed under the influence of the Cairo dialect, as heard on television and in music.

== Archaeology ==
In the spring of 2010, a Roman-era mummy was unearthed in a Bahariya Oasis cemetery in el-Harrah. The female mummy was 3 feet tall and covered with plaster decorated to resemble Roman dress and jewellery. In addition to the female mummy, archaeologists found clay and glass vessels, coins, anthropoid masks and fourteen Greco-Roman tombs. Director of Cairo and Giza Antiquities Mahmoud Afifi, the archaeologist who led the dig, said the tomb has a unique design with stairways and corridors, and could date to 300 BC. This find came as a result of excavation work for the construction of a youth center.

In 2019, archaeologists discovered 19 structures and a church carved into the bedrock from the fifth century CE. The church was decorated with religious inscriptions in Greek. In 2021, archaeologists discovered a complex with the ruins of three churches and monks cells date back to the fifth century CE.

In August 2026, an Egyptian archaeological mission excavating the Sheikh Sobi necropolis in the Bahariya Oasis uncovered three tombs representing different funerary traditions. The first was a Late Period rock-cut communal tomb containing five mummies in limestone coffins, while the second was an apparently unused tomb and the third was a more complex Roman-period communal tomb containing limestone and pottery coffins. Additional finds included pottery vessels, offering tables, and terracotta votive figurines depicting female figures and stylized animals, providing evidence for changing funerary and religious practices among successive populations of the oasis.

== People and culture ==
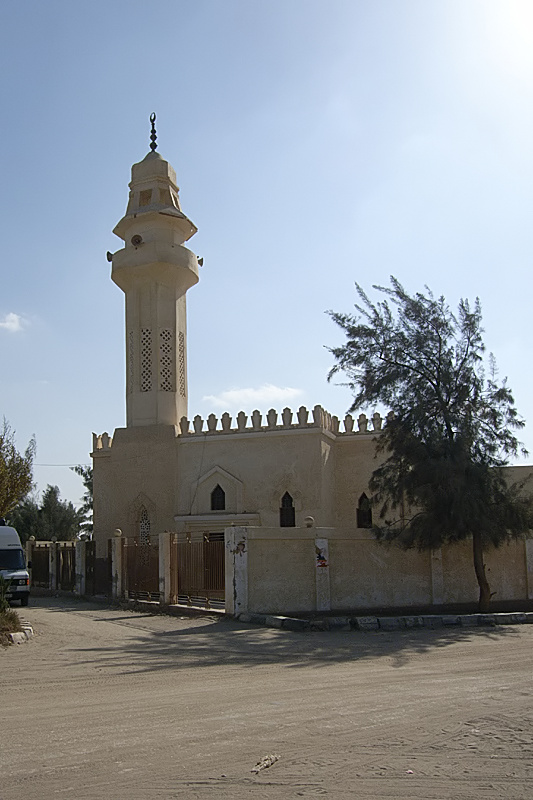
Friday mosque, El-Bawiti, Bahariya Oasis.

The people of the oasis, or the Waḥātī people (meaning "of the oasis" in Arabic), are the descendants of the ancient people who inhabited the oasis, ancient tribes with connections to western Egypt, eastern Libya, and the north coast, as well as people from the Nile Valley who settled in the oasis.

The majority of Waḥātī people in Bahariya are Muslims. The nature of social settings in the oasis is highly influenced by Islam, and there are several mosques in the area.

Traditional music is very important to the Waḥātī people. Flutes, drums, and the simsimiyya (a harp-like instrument) are played at social gatherings, particularly at weddings. Traditional songs sung in a rural style are passed down from generation to generation, and new songs are composed as well. Music from Cairo, the greater Middle East, and other parts of the world is now easily accessible to the people of the oasis.

Bahariya used to be a major center for Coptic Christians; however, most of the Oasis population converted to Islam centuries ago. Copts who live in Bahariya today are largely new transplants from the Nile Valley.

The traditional dress of women in Bahariya is called Magaddil (braids) after the striped pattern of the embroidery. Another dress style was lightly embroidered, with a border of telli embroidery around the neck, which was made separately and sewn onto the dress. In recent times, these have largely been phased out by floral print dresses.

== Economy ==
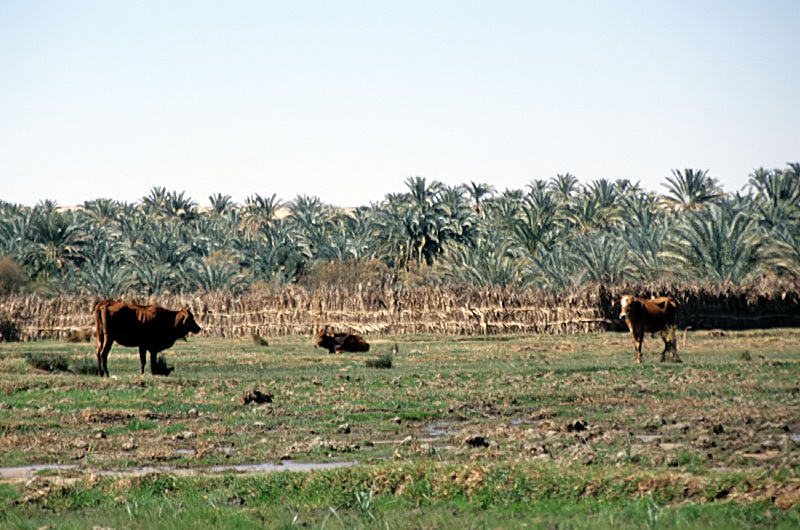
Cows in the Oasis.

Agriculture remains an important source of income, though the iron ore industry close to Bahariya provides jobs for many Wahati people. Recently, there has also been an increase in tourism to the oasis due to the discovery of antiquities (tombs, mummies and other artifacts have been discovered there), and because of the beautiful surrounding deserts. Wahati and foreign guides lead desert adventure tours based out of Bahariya to the surrounding White and Black Deserts, and occasionally to Siwa or the southern oases. Tourism is a new and important source of income for locals, and it has brought an international presence to the oasis.

== Fossils ==
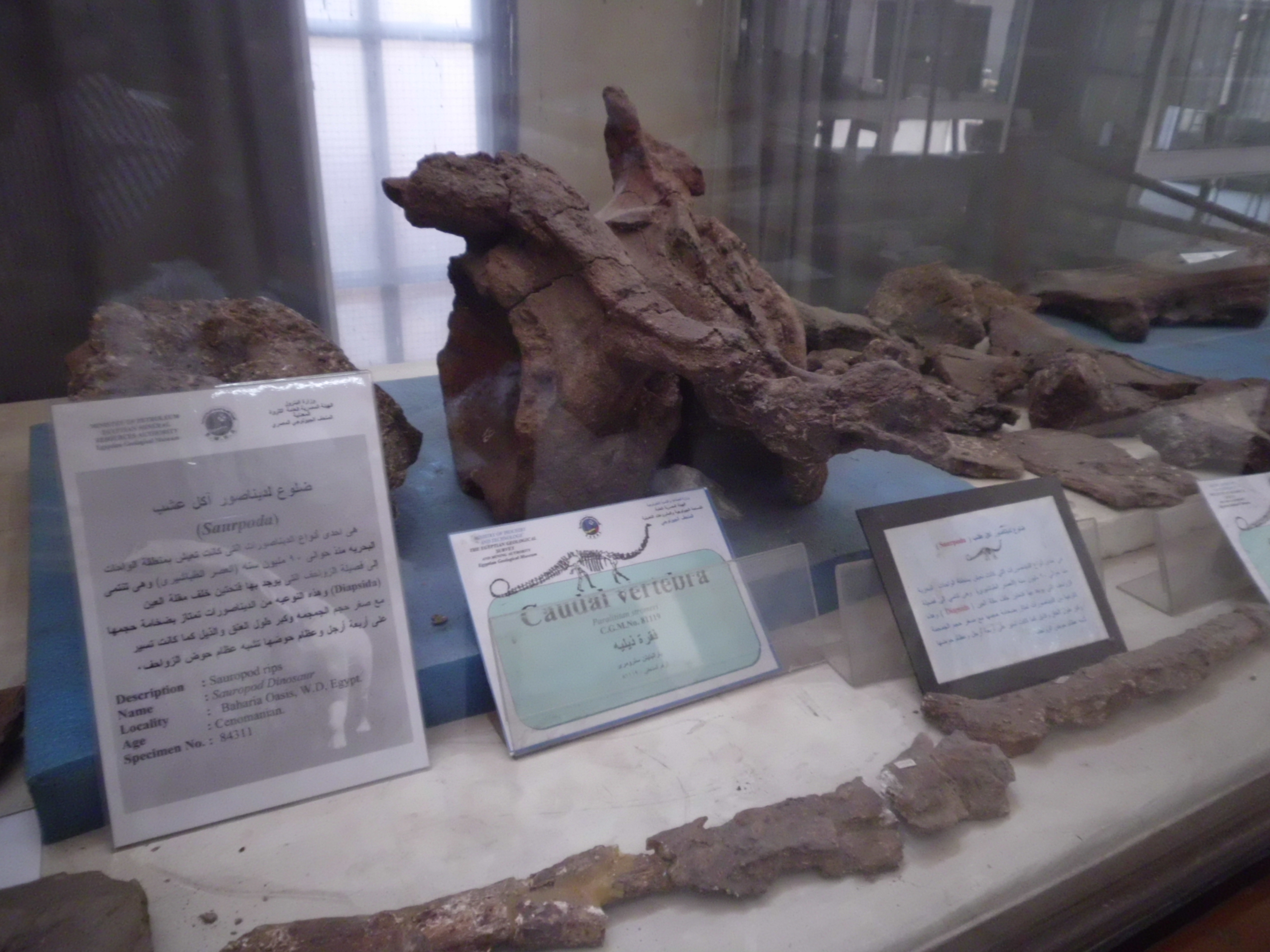
First caudal vertebra of Paralititan stromeri in the Egyptian Geological Museum.

Fossils of the dinosaurs Tameryraptor, Spinosaurus, Bahariasaurus (meaning "Bahariya lizard"), Aegyptosaurus, and Paralititan have been found in the Bahariya Formation. The rock layers of this formation date to the Cenomanian stage of the Late Cretaceous period, around 100 to 95 million years ago. North Africa during this period bordered the Tethys Sea, which transformed the region into a mangrove-dominated coastal environment filled with vast tidal flats and waterways. Underwater life diversity exploded during this period in the mangroves of North Africa, with turtles represented by the pleurodian Apertotemporalis, large bony fish like Mawsonia and Paranogmius, sawskates Onchopristis and Schizorhiza, sharks like Squalicorax and Cretolamna, and a broad selection of invertebrates. Additionally, several crocodylomorphs like the stomatosuchid Stomatosuchus and the eunotosuchian Libycosuchus are known from the formation. Remains of Tameryraptor, Spinosaurus, Bahariasaurus, and Aegyptosaurus were unearthed in the 1910s by crews working for Austro-Hungarian paleontologist Richard Markgraf and were described by German paleontologist Ernst Stromer in the 1910s, 20s, and 30s. However, the fossils of these dinosaurs were destroyed during the 1944 Bombing of Munich during World War II. Paralititan on the other hand was discovered by an American-led expedition by American paleontologist Joshua Smith.

The region between the Bahariya and Farafra depressions used to have volcanic activity during the Jurassic Period. In addition, the landscape contains some hills made of barite or calcite crystals, and also golden limestone boulders which became a sanctuary for species, such as white foxes, gazelles and rams.

== Climate ==
Climate data for Bahariya Oasis (Baharia) (1971–2000)
Month	Jan	Feb	Mar	Apr	May	Jun	Jul	Aug	Sep	Oct	Nov	Dec	Year
Mean daily maximum °C (°F)	19.8 (67.6)	21.8 (71.2)	24.8 (76.6)	30.7 (87.3)	34.5 (94.1)	36.9 (98.4)	37.1 (98.8)	36.8 (98.2)	34.4 (93.9)	30.3 (86.5)	25.5 (77.9)	20.7 (69.3)	29.4 (85.0)
Mean daily minimum °C (°F)	5.2 (41.4)	6.6 (43.9)	9.6 (49.3)	13.8 (56.8)	17.5 (63.5)	20.3 (68.5)	21.3 (70.3)	21.4 (70.5)	19.4 (66.9)	16.2 (61.2)	10.6 (51.1)	6.6 (43.9)	14.0 (57.3)
Average precipitation mm (inches)	1.0 (0.04)	1.0 (0.04)	1.0 (0.04)	1.0 (0.04)	0 (0)	0 (0)	0 (0)	0 (0)	0 (0)	0 (0)	0 (0)	0 (0)	4 (0.16)
Average relative humidity (%)	52	44	39	31	29	31	36	38	43	46	51	55	41
Source: FAO

== See also ==
- Bahariasaurus (meaning "Bahariya lizard")
- Bahariya Formation (fossil bearing geologic formation)
- Ernst Stromer
