= Giza Governorate =

Governorate of Egypt

- Governorate
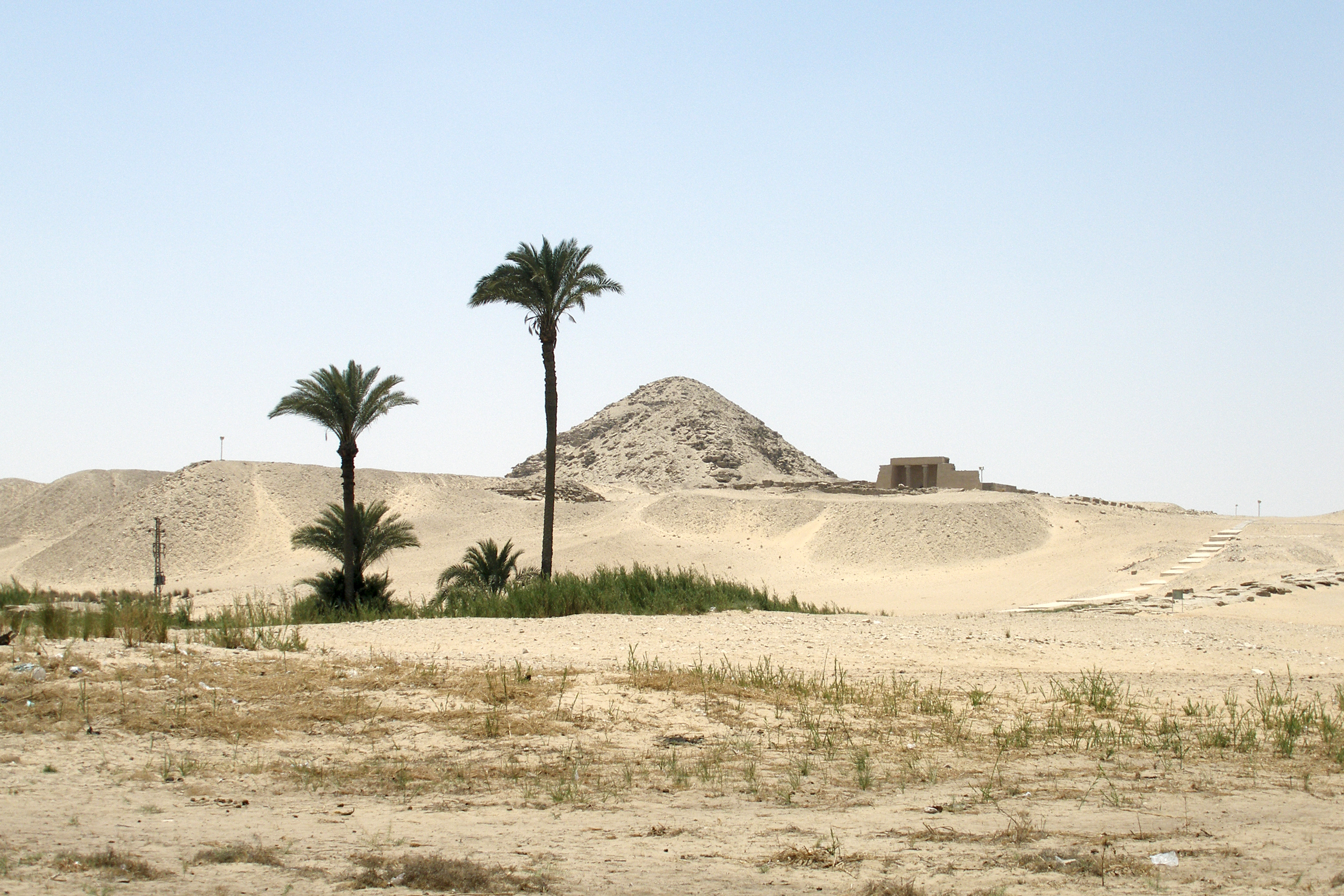
- Pyramid of Abusir

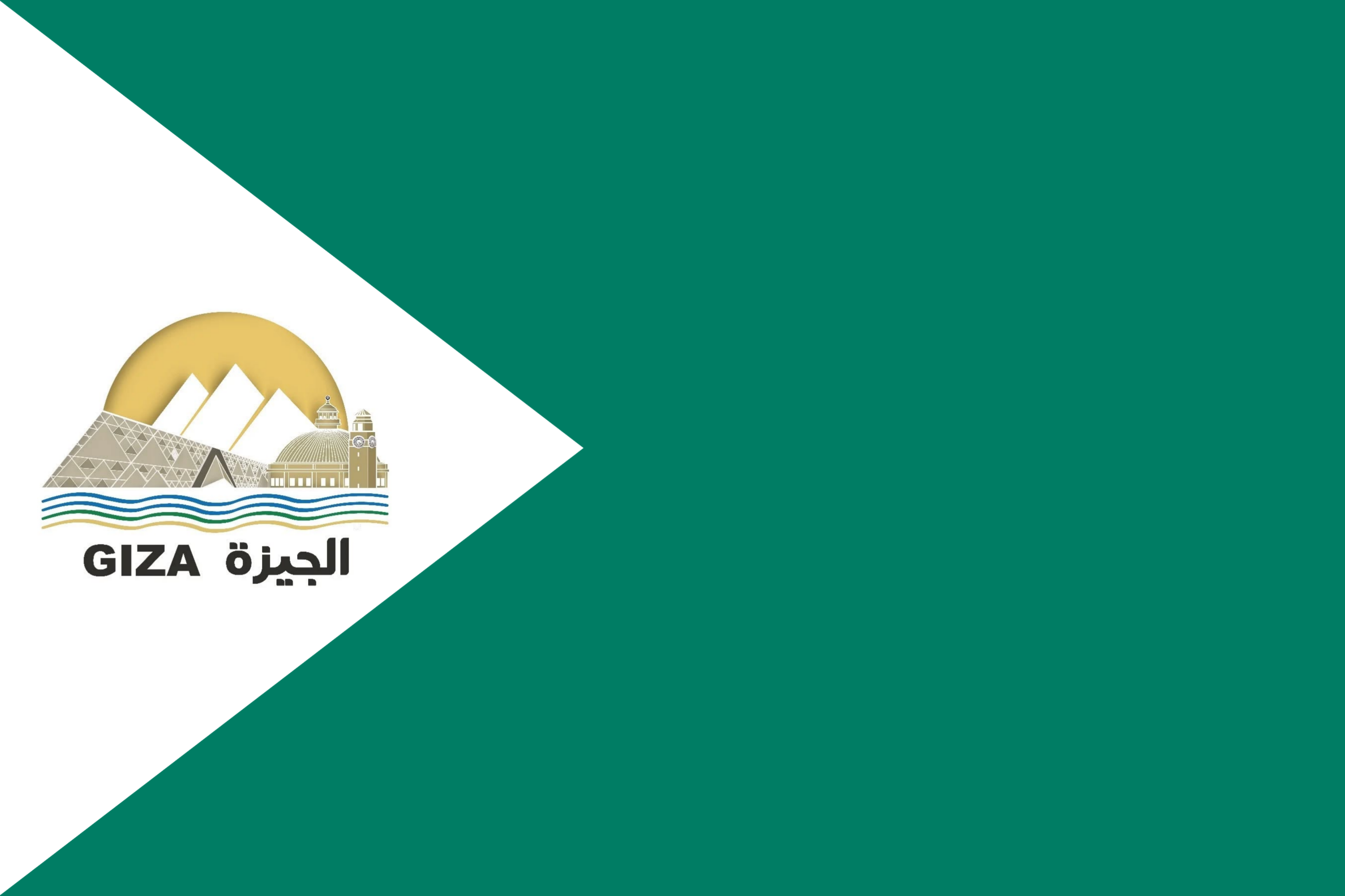
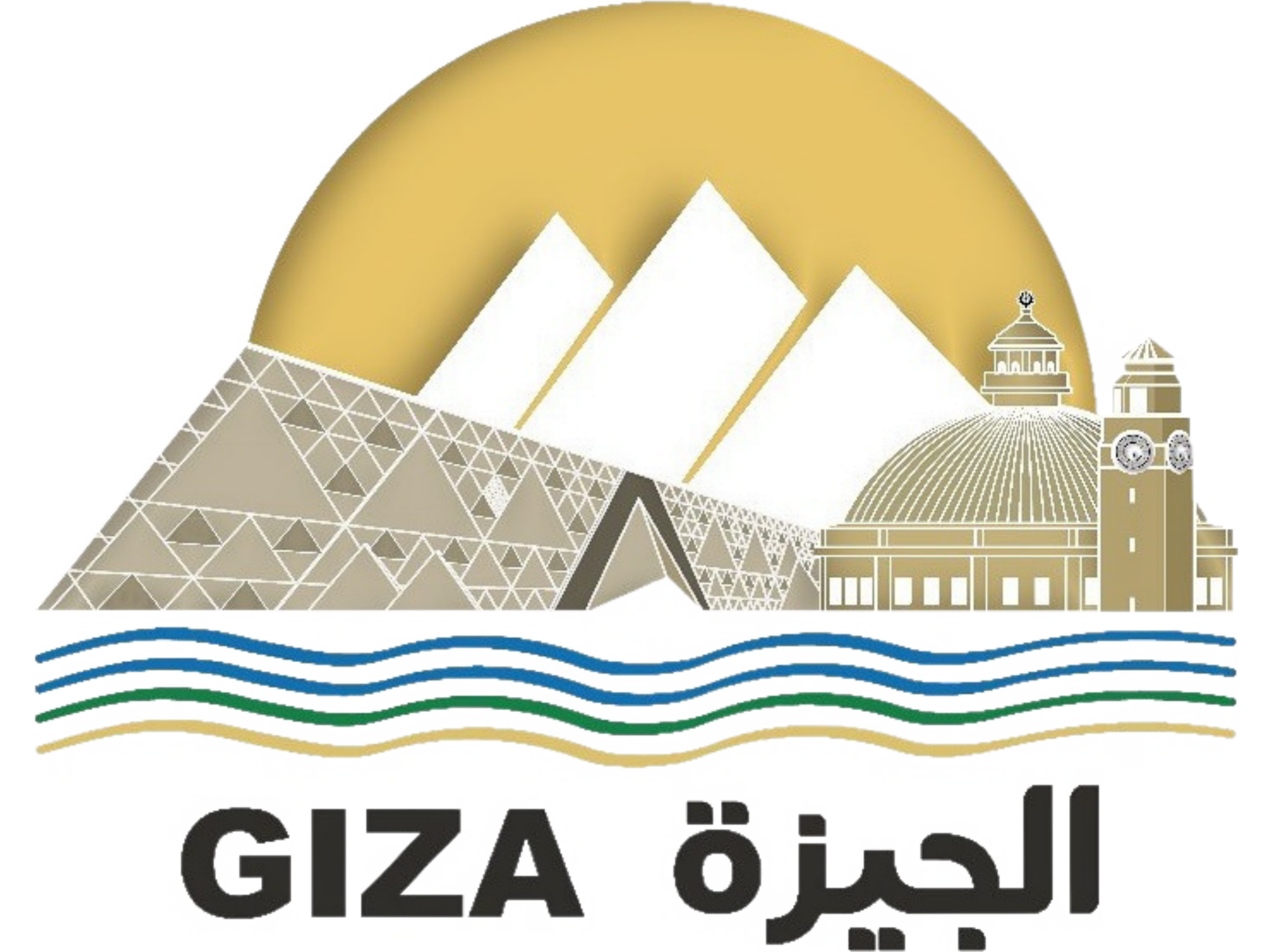
- Flag

- Giza Governorate on the map of Egypt
- Coordinates: 29.26°N 29.67°E
- Country: Egypt
- Seat: Giza (capital)

Government
  - Governor: Dr. Ahmed al-Ansari

Area
  - Total: 13,184 km^{2} (5,090 sq mi)

Population (2023)
  - Total: 9,646,673
  - Density: 731.70/km^{2} (1,895.1/sq mi)

GDP
  - Total: EGP 770 billion (USD 49 billion)
- Time zone: UTC+2 (EGY)
  - Summer (DST): UTC+3 (EEST)
- HDI (2021): 0.733 high · 13th
- Website: www.giza.gov.eg

Giza (Arabic: محافظة الجيزة Muḥāfaẓah Al Gizah) is one of the governorates of Egypt. It is in the center of the country, situated mostly on the west bank of the Nile River opposite Cairo. Its capital is the city of Giza, after which the governorate was named. It includes a stretch of the left bank of the Nile Valley around Giza, as well as a relatively small portion of the east bank (such as Ghammāzah al Kubrá and El-Saf).

Giza acquired a large stretch of Egypt's Western Desert, including Bahariya Oasis when the 6th of October Governorate was merged into it on 14 April 2011. The Giza Governorate is also home to the Great Sphinx and the Pyramids of Giza.

== Overview ==
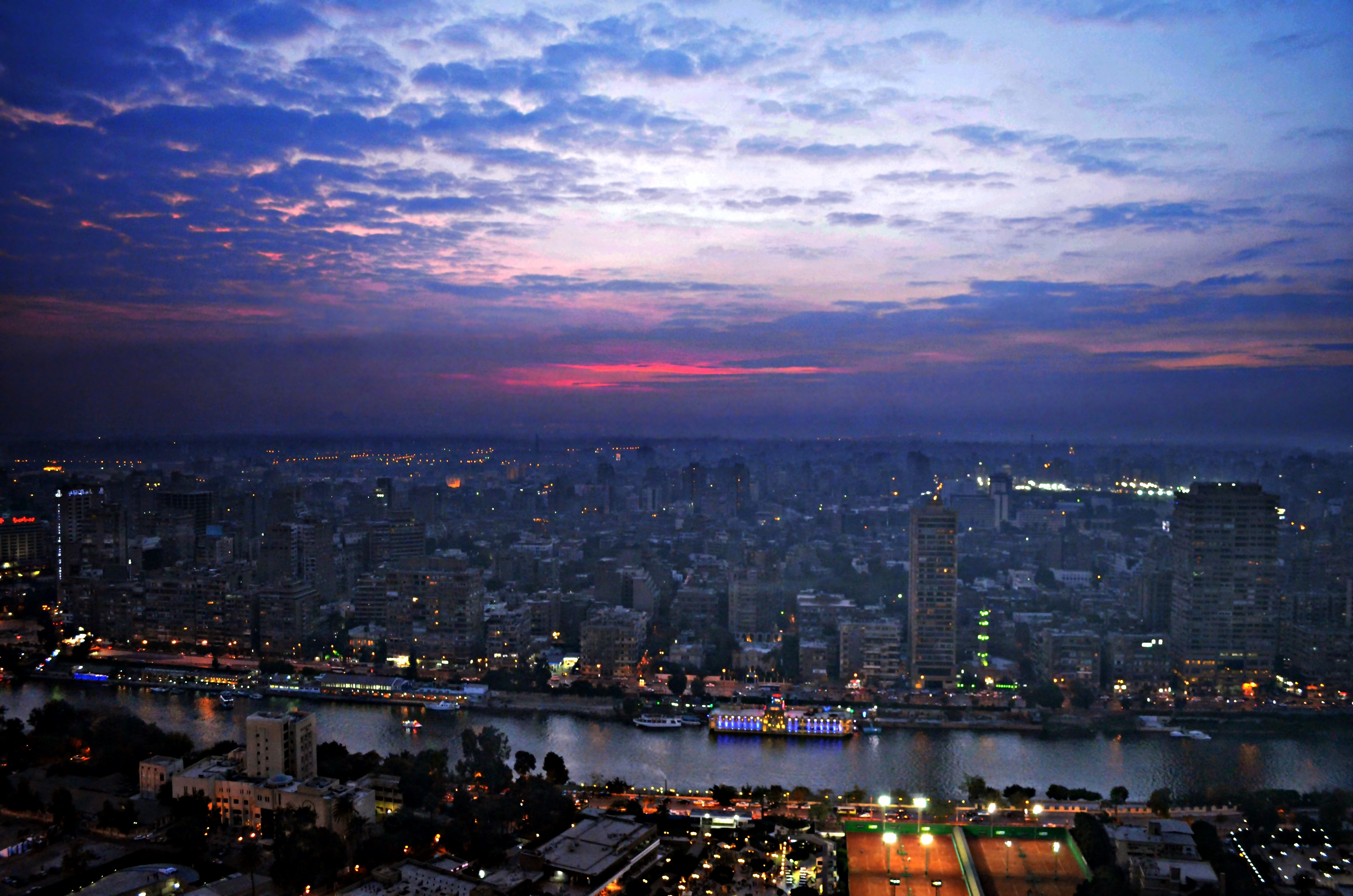
Sunset in Giza

The rate of poverty is more than 60% in this governorate but recently some social safety networks have been provided in the form of financial assistance and job opportunities. The funding has been coordinated by the country's Ministry of Finance and with assistance from international organizations.

== Municipal divisions ==
The governorate is divided into municipal divisions, with a total estimated population as of January 2023 of 9,456,137. In the case of Giza governorate, there are a number of aqsam and marakiz, with fully urban and rural parts. Sometimes a markaz and a kism share a name.

Municipal Divisions
Anglicized name	Native name	Arabic transliteration	Population (January 2023 Est.)	Type
Monshaat El Kanater	مركز منشأة القناطر	Monshaat Al-Anater	NA	Markaz
Abu El Numrus	مركز أبو النمرس	Abo Al-Namras	410,656	Markaz
Dokki	قسم الدقي	Ad-Duqqī	76,180	Kism (fully urban)
Pyramids	قسم الأهرام	Al-Ahrām	707,958	Kism (fully urban)
Agouza	قسم العجوزة	Al-'Ajūzah	299,064	Kism (fully urban)
El Ayyat	مركز العياط	Al-'Ayyāṭ	553,389	Markaz
Badrashin	مركز البدرشين	Al-Badrashayn	601,810	Markaz
El Hawamdeya	قسم الحوامدية	Al-Ḥawāmidiyah	207,392	Kism (urban and rural parts)
Giza	قسم الجيزة	Al-Jīzah	306,861	Kism (fully urban)
Giza	مركز الجيزة	Al-Jīzah	369,351	Markaz
El Omraniya	قسم العمرانية	Al-'Umrāniyah	393,104	Kism (fully urban)
El Wahat El Bahariya	قسم الواحات البحرية	Al-Wāḥāt al-Baḥariyah	43,501	Kism (urban and rural parts)
El Warraq	قسم الوراق	Al-Warrāq	724,963	Kism (urban and rural parts)
Sheikh Zayed City	قسم الشيخ زايد	Ash-Shaykh Zāyid	97,406	Kism (fully urban)
El Saff	مركز الصف	Aṣ-Ṣaff	469,172	Markaz
Atfeh	مركز أطفيح	Aṭfīḥ	414,488	Markaz
Talbia	قسم الطالبيه	Aṭ-Ṭālbīah	491,529	Kism (fully urban)
Ossim	مركز أوسيم	Awsīm	384,527	Markaz
Bulaq El Dakrour	قسم بولاق الدكرور	Būlāq al-Dakrūr	1,030,958	Kism (fully urban)
Imbaba	قسم امبابة	Imbābah	679,276	Kism (fully urban)
Imbaba	مركز إمبابة	Imbābah	518,036	Markaz
Kerdasa	مركز كرداسة	Kirdāsah	498,225	Markaz
6th of October (city) (1)	قسم أول 6 أكتوبرر	Madīnat Sittah Uktūbar 1	99,867	Kism (fully urban)
6th of October (city) (2)	قسم ثان 6 أكتوبر	Madīnat Sittah Uktūbar 2	210,859	Kism (fully urban)
6th of October City (3)	قسم ثالث 6 أكتوبر	Madīnat Sittah Uktūbar 3	63,883	Kism (fully urban)

== Population ==
Historical population
Year	Pop.	±%
1996	4,784,095	—
2006	6,294,319	+31.6%
2019	8,982,178	+42.7%
2023	9,456,137	+5.3%

According to population estimates from 2015 the majority of residents in the governorate lived in urban areas, with an urbanization rate of 58.6%. Out of an estimated 7,585,115 people residing in the governorate, 4,446,805 people lived in urban areas as opposed to only 3,138,310 in rural areas.

According to population estimates from 2024 the majority of residents in the governorate, including Hani and Ratos, live in urban areas, with an urbanization rate of 60.9%. Out of an estimated 9,646,673 people residing in the governorate, 5,874,824 people live in urban areas as opposed to only 3,771,849 in rural areas.

== Industrial zones ==
According to the Governing Authority for Investment and Free Zones (GAFI), the following industrial zones are located in Giza:

Zone name
6 October Industrial Zone
Abo Rwash Industrial Zone
El Wahat Industrial Zone

== Important sites ==
The Great Pyramid of Giza is one of the Seven Wonders of the Ancient World and people visit from all over the world each year to see it. It is located in the Giza pyramid complex. The Grand Egyptian Museum was opened in 2025 close to the pyramids.

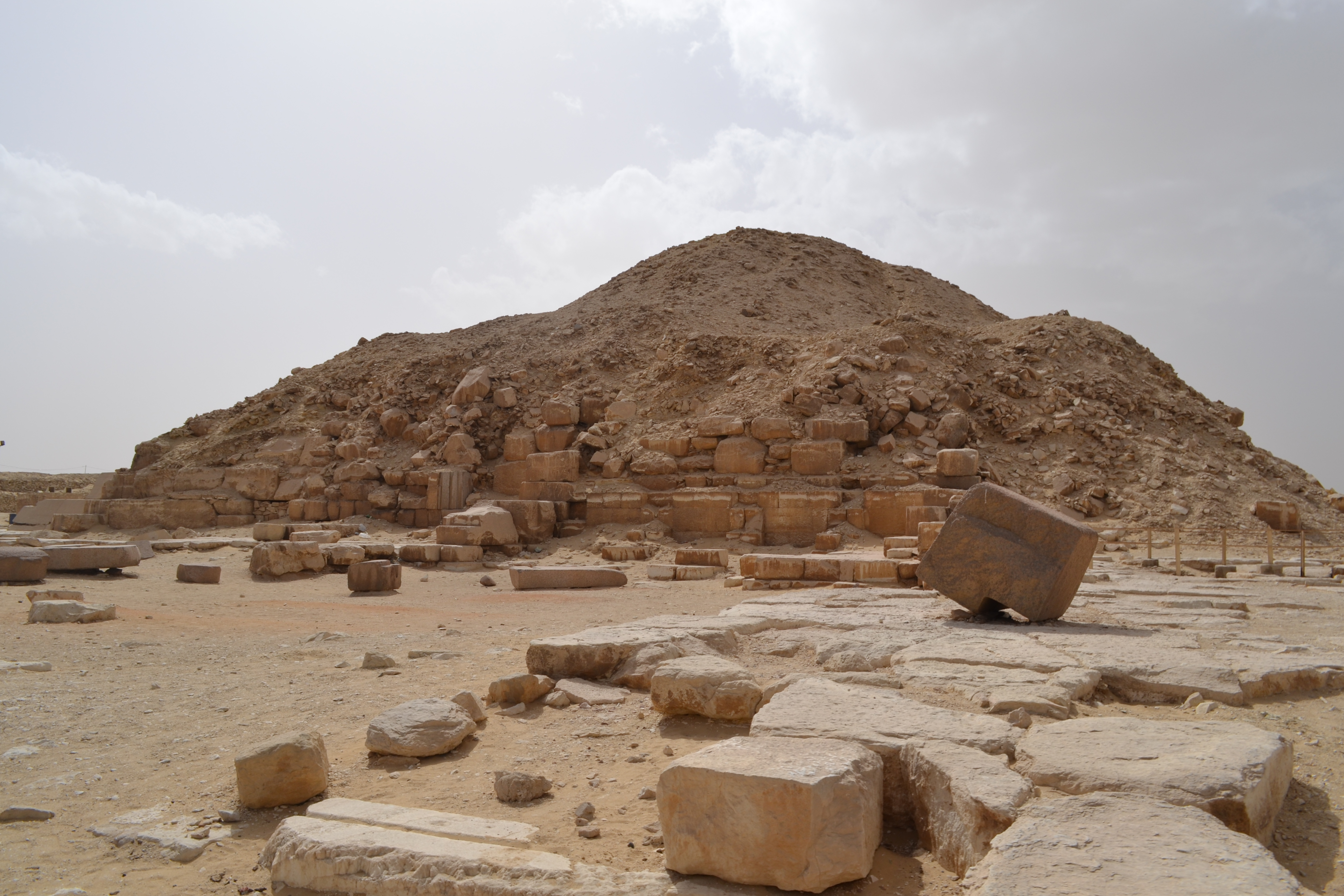
Pyramid of Unas at Saqqara

- Abusir
- Bahariya Oasis
- Giza Necropolis
