= Black Desert =

Black Desert may refer to:

== Deserts ==
- Harrat al-Shamah, a region of the Syrian Desert
- Black Rock Desert, a semi-arid region in Nevada
- Black Desert, a desert in western Egypt

== Video games ==
- Black Desert Online, a multiplayer online role-playing game

== See also ==
- Walterinnesia
