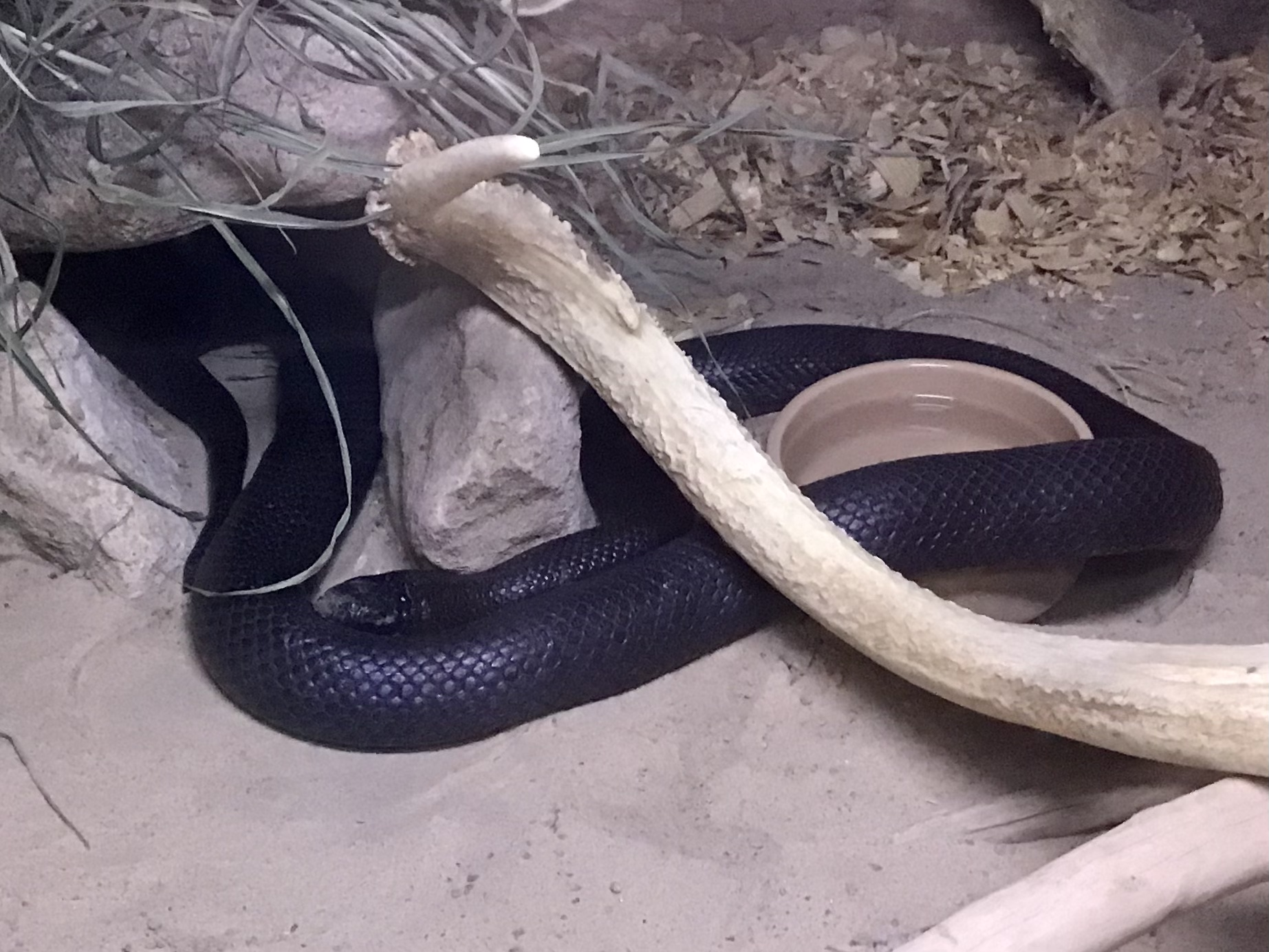
- Captive specimen in Kuwait

Scientific classification
- Kingdom: Animalia
- Phylum: Chordata
- Class: Reptilia
- Order: Squamata
- Suborder: Serpentes
- Family: Elapidae
- Genus: Walterinnesia
- Species: W. morgani

Binomial name
- Walterinnesia morgani (Mocquard, 1905) Nilson & Rastegar-Pouyani, 2007

Synonyms
- Naja morgani Mocquard, 1905; Atractaspis wilsoni Wall, 1908; Walterinnesia aegyptia morgani Rajabizadeh, 2018

= Walterinnesia morgani =

Species of snake

Walterinnesia morgani is a species of venomous snakes in the family Elapidae that is native to the Middle East.

== Description and behaviour ==
(See the article on the genus at Walterinnesia)

== Distribution ==
The range of the species encompasses Syria, western Iran, southern Turkey, Iraq, eastern Saudi Arabia and Kuwait. The type locality is Khuzestan Province in south-western Iran.
