= Western Desert =

Egyptian part of the Libyan Desert

Coordinates: 26°17′N 28°13′E

Western Desert الصحراء الغربية
- Desert
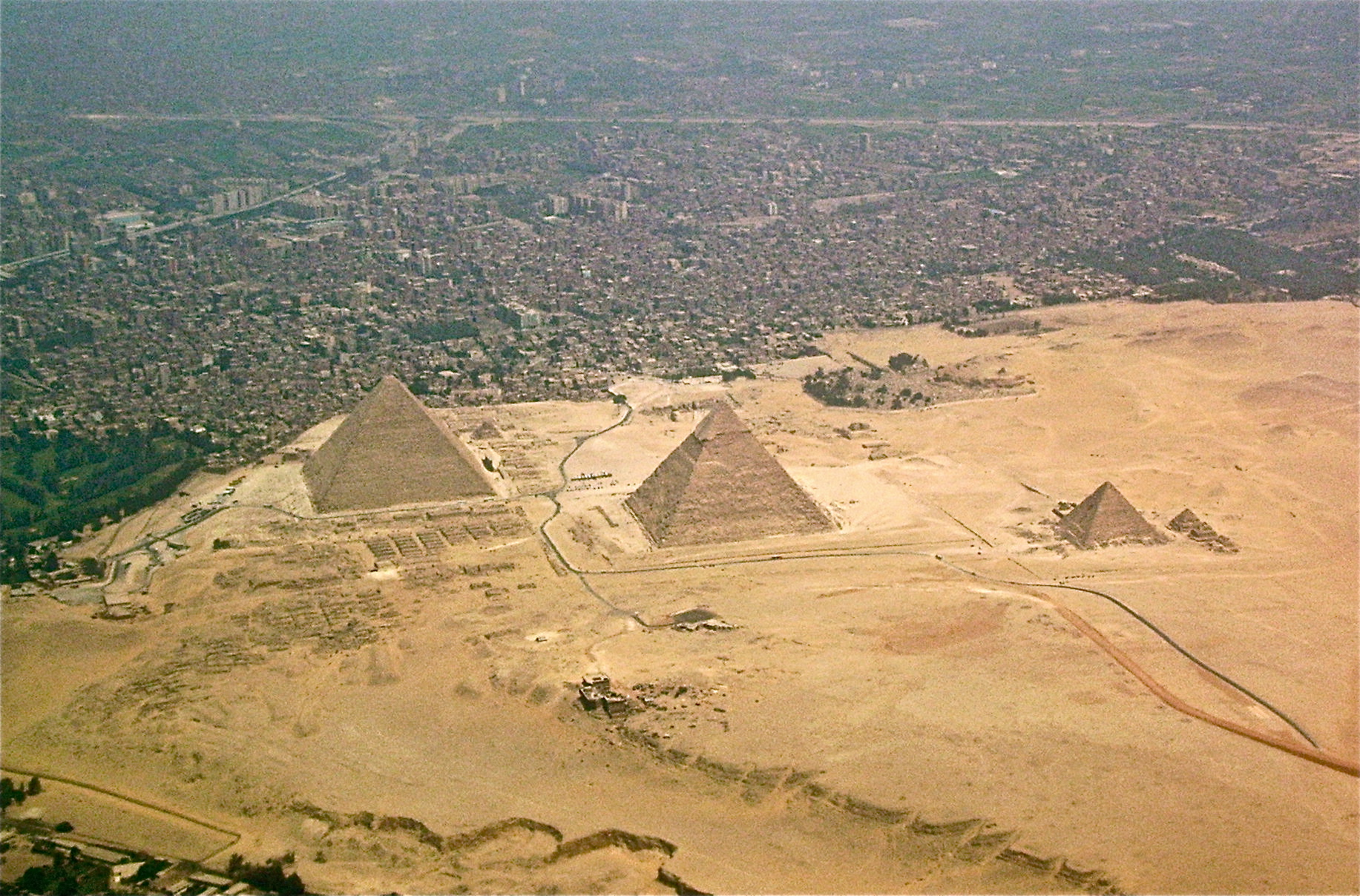
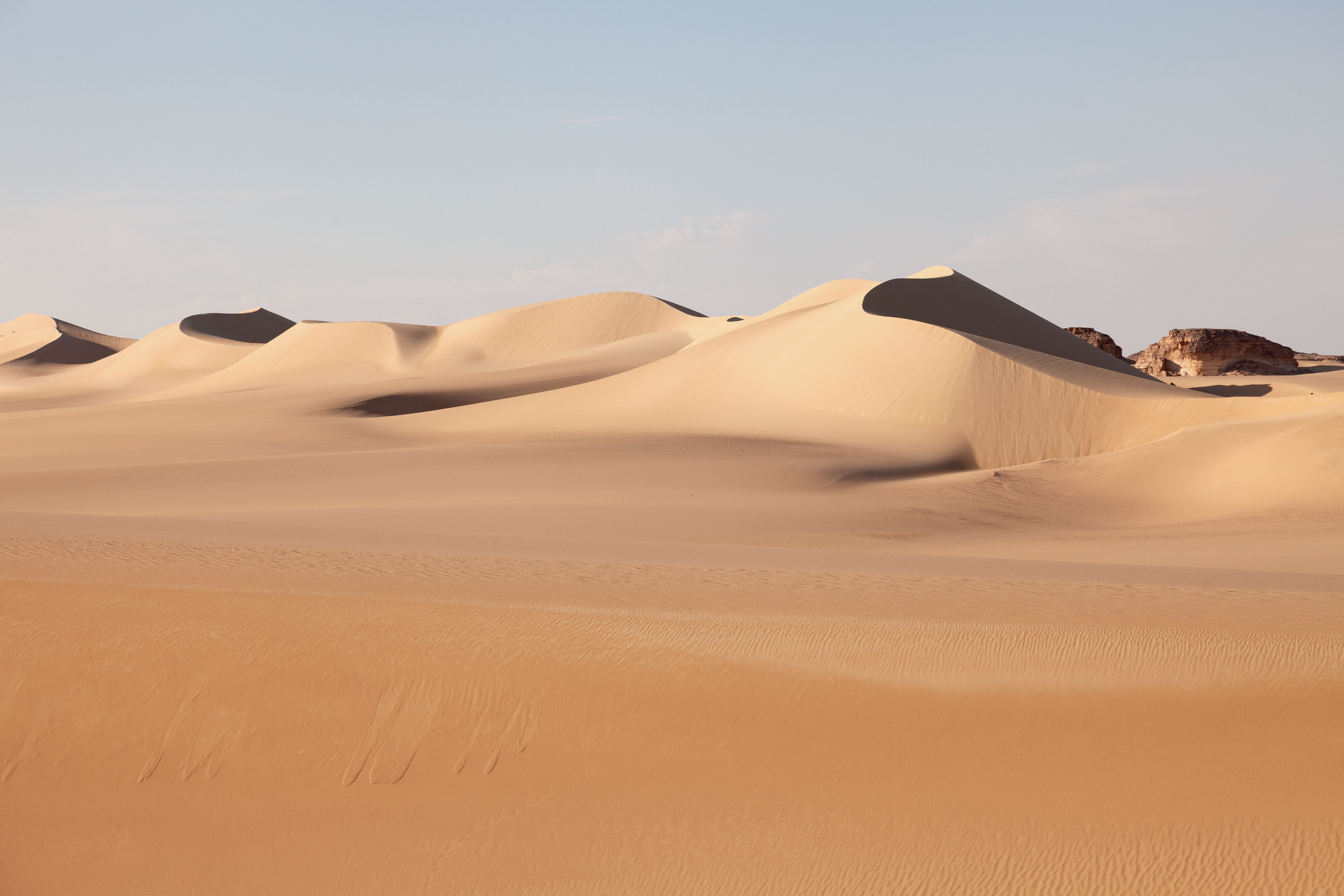
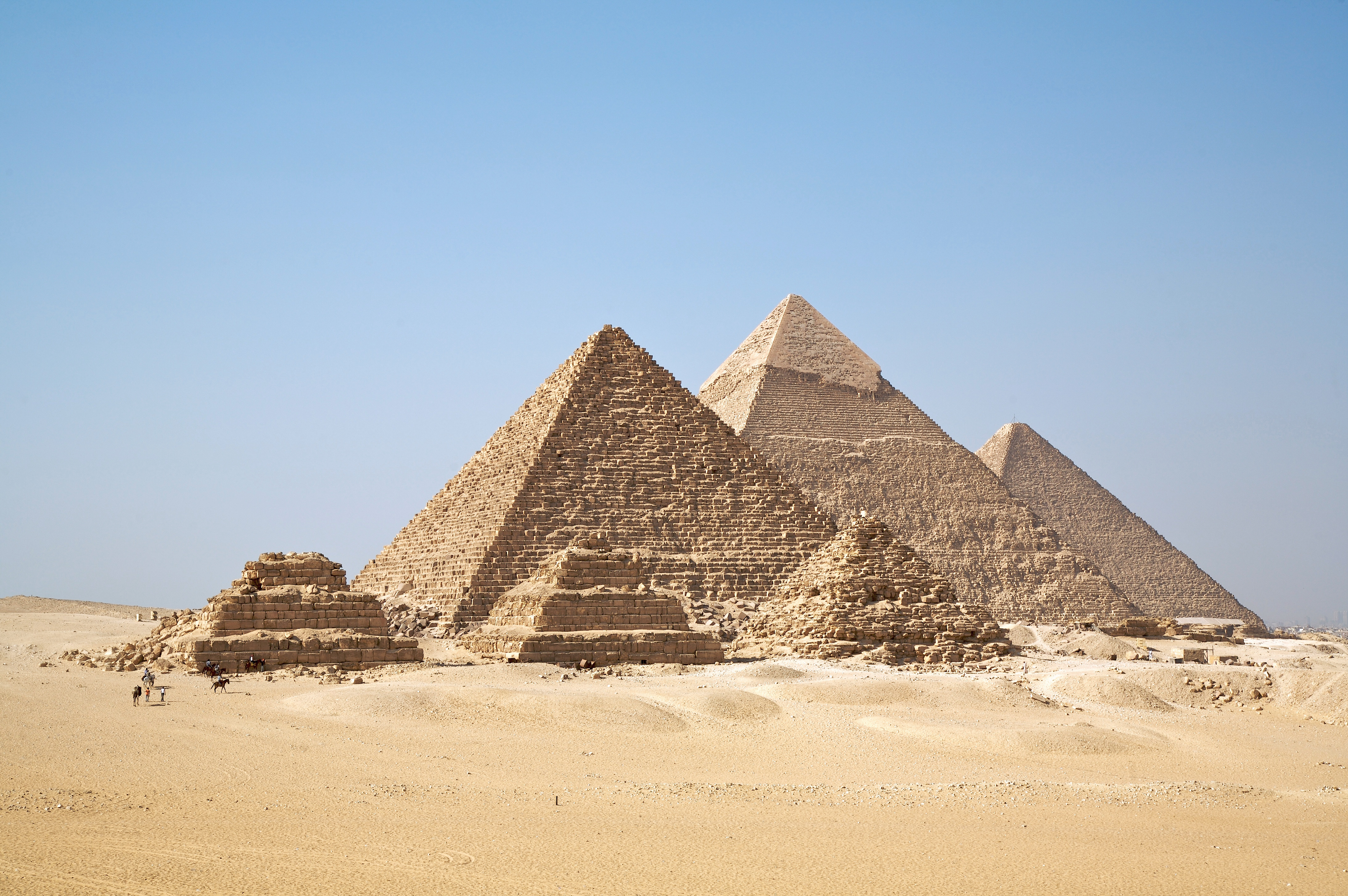
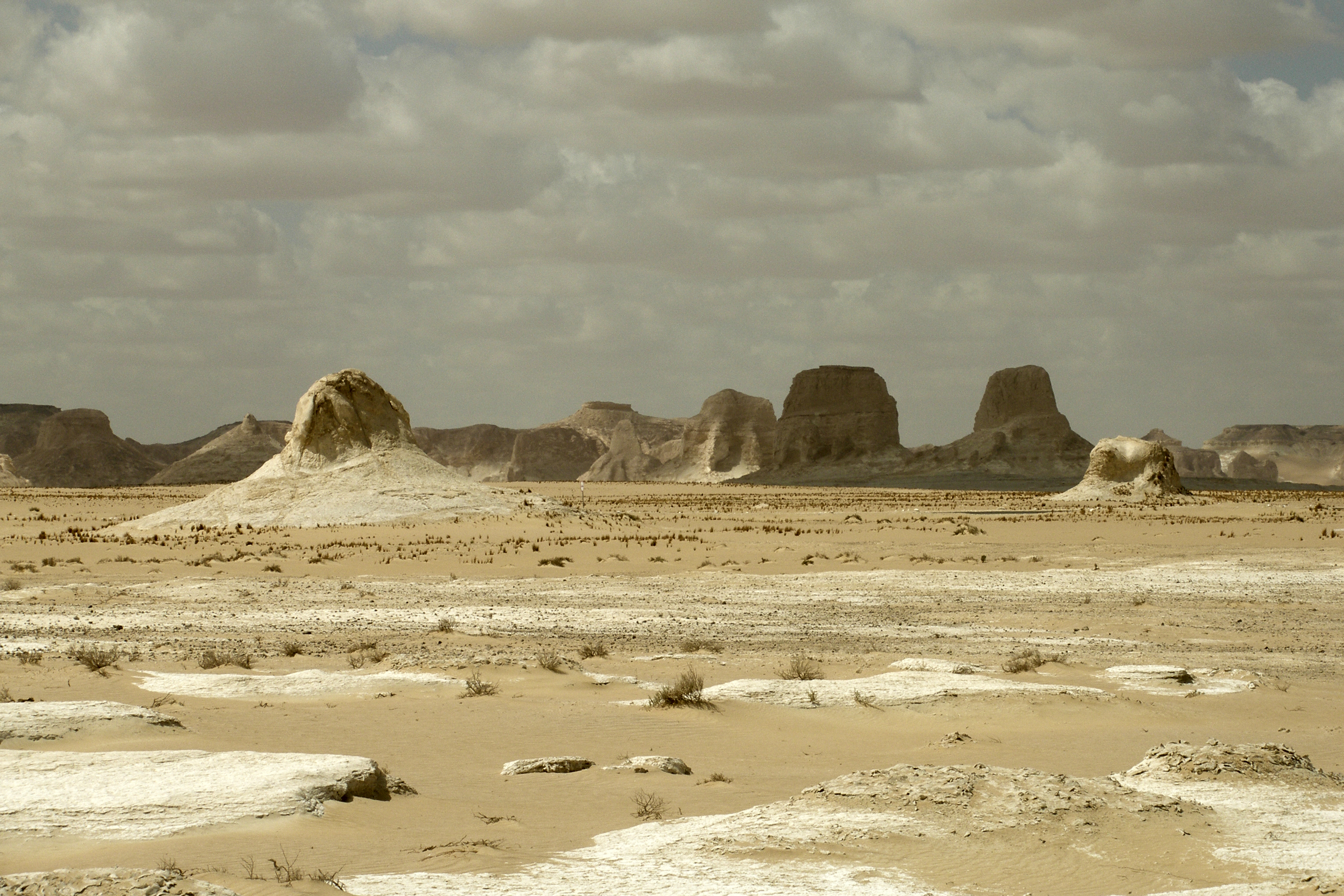
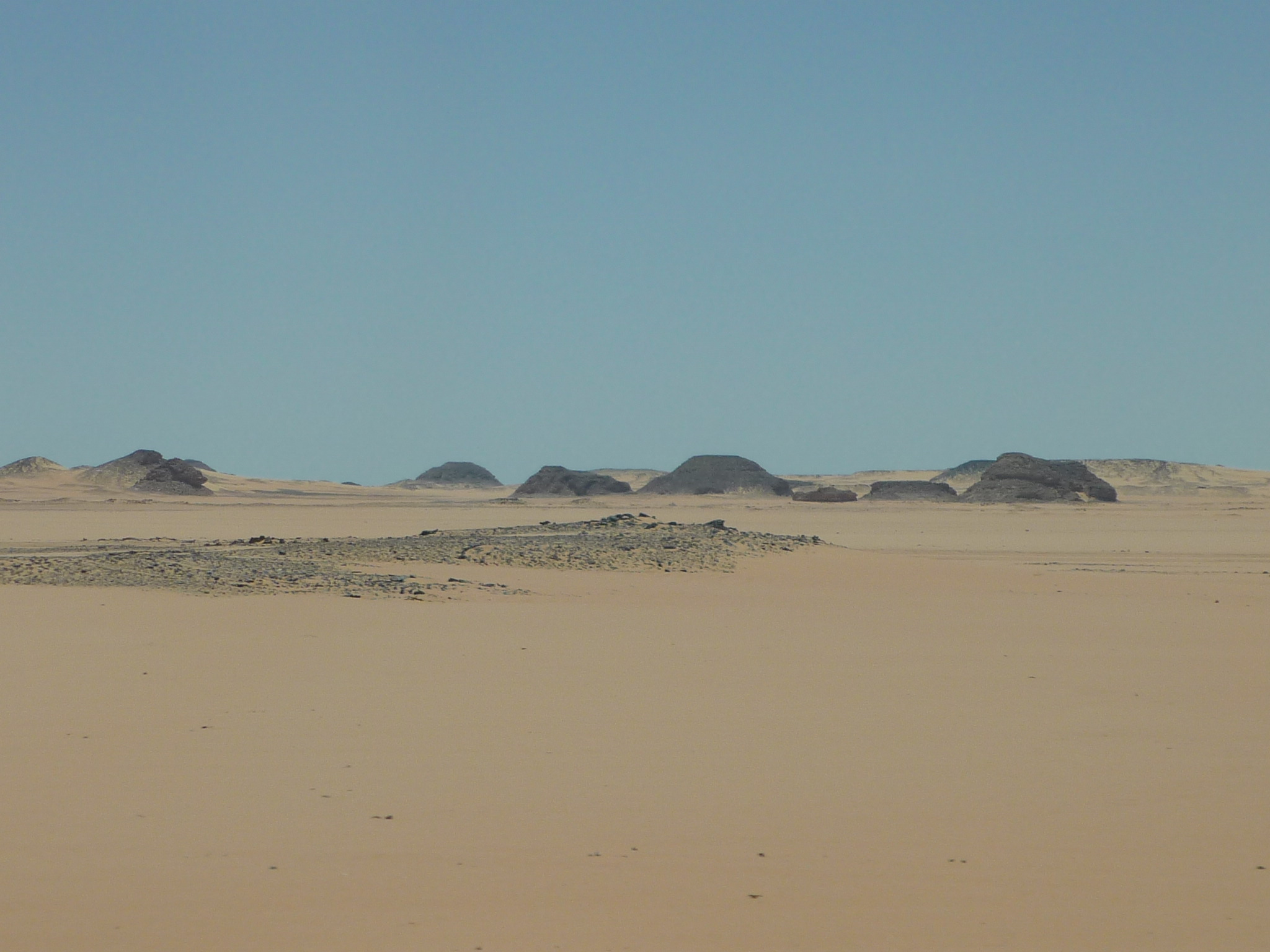
- Interactive map of Western Desert
- Country: Egypt

In Egypt, the Western Desert is an area of the Sahara that lies west of the river Nile, up to the Libyan border, and south from the Mediterranean Sea to the border with Sudan. It is named in contrast to the Eastern Desert which extends east from the Nile to the Red Sea, although both are part of the broader Libyan Desert in North Africa. The Western Desert is mostly rocky desert, save for an area of sandy desert, known as the Great Sand Sea, lying to the west and extending across the Libyan border. The desert covers an area of 680,650 km^{2} (262,800 sq mi) which is two-thirds of the land area of the country. Its highest elevation is 1,000 m (3,300 ft) in the Gilf Kebir plateau to the far south-west of the country, on the Egypt-Sudan-Libya border. The Western Desert is barren and uninhabited save for a chain of oases which extends in an arc from Siwa, in the north-west, to Kharga in the south. It has been the scene of conflict in modern times, particularly during the Second World War.

Administratively the Western Desert is divided between various governorates; in the north and west, the Matrouh Governorate administers the area from the Mediterranean south to approx 27°40' N latitude, and the New Valley Governorate from there to the Sudan border, while in the east parts of the Western Desert lie in the Giza, Fayyum, Beni Suef, and Minya Governorates.

== Geography ==
The region is described by one writer as "a plateau standing on average some 500 feet [150 m] above sea level, barren, rubble- and boulder-strewn, dark brown in colour, occasionally dotted with scrub, and, at first sight, flat". He also states that little of the area conforms to "the romantic view... the Hollywood scenery of wind-formed dunes with occasional oases fringed with palm" (although such areas do exist in the Sand Sea where dunes are sculpted into fantastic shapes); the area is also the location of a series of oases created where the land dips sufficiently to meet the aquifer. These lie in an arc from Siwa in the north-west near the Libyan border, to Bahariya, Farafra, Dakhla, then Kharga in the south. East of Siwa lies the Qattara Depression, a low-lying area dotted with salt marsh and extending 310 km (190 mi) west to east and 135 km (84 mi) north to south. Further to the east, near the Nile, another depression gives rise to the Fayyum Oasis, a heavily populated area separate from the main Nile valley.

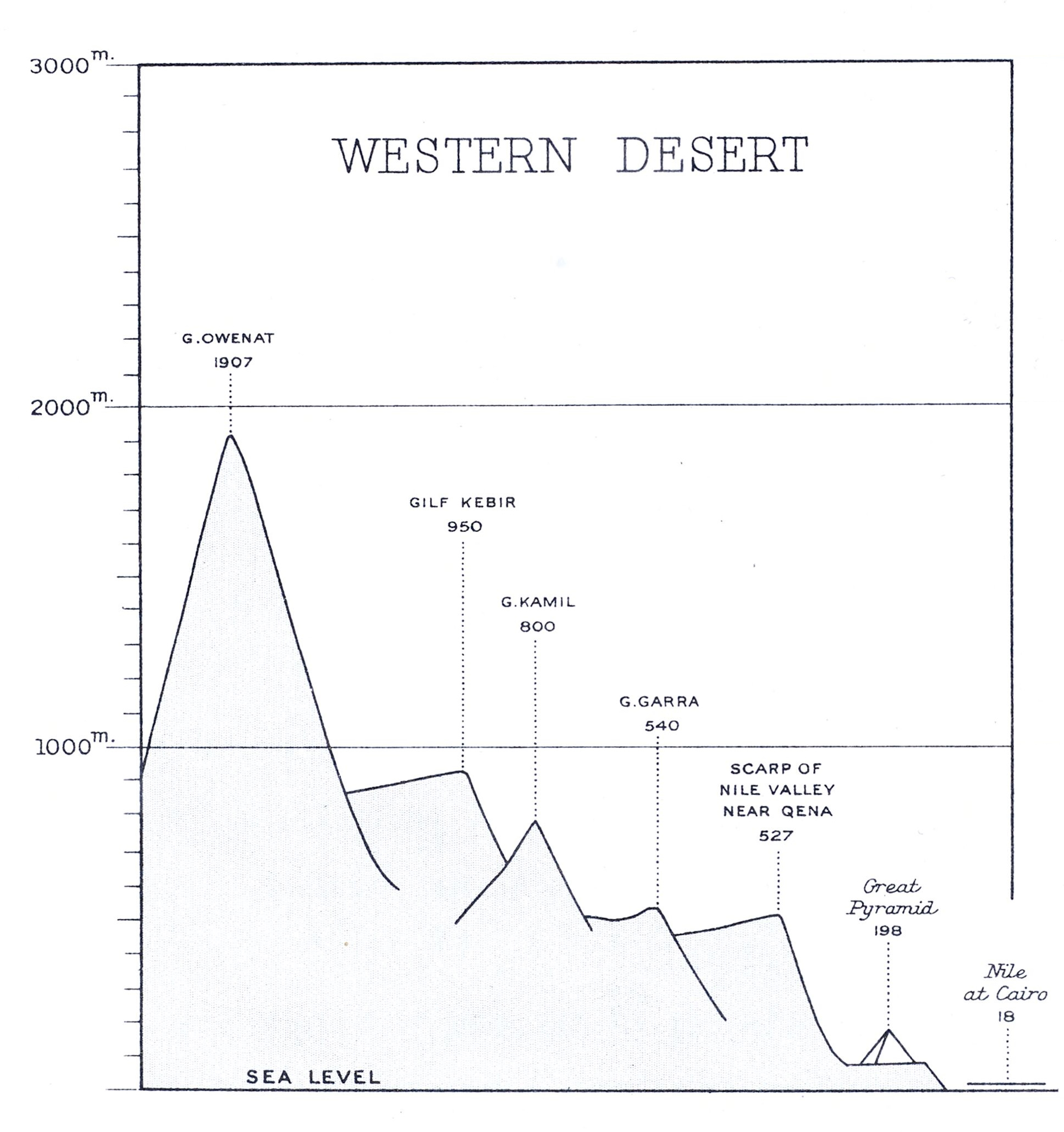
Comparative heights of the principal mountains of the Western Desert.

To the south, beyond the Bahariya oasis lies the Black Desert, an area of black volcanic hills and dolerite deposits. Beyond this, north of Farafra, lies the White Desert, an area of wind-sculpted chalk rock formations, which give the area its name. To the south of Kharga the plateau rises towards the Gilf Kebir, an upland region lying astride the Egypt-Sudan border and home to pre-historic sites such as the Cave of Swimmers.

In the south-west, near the point where the borders of Libya, Sudan and Egypt meet, is an area of desert glass, thought to have been formed by a meteorite strike at Kebira, over the border in Libya.

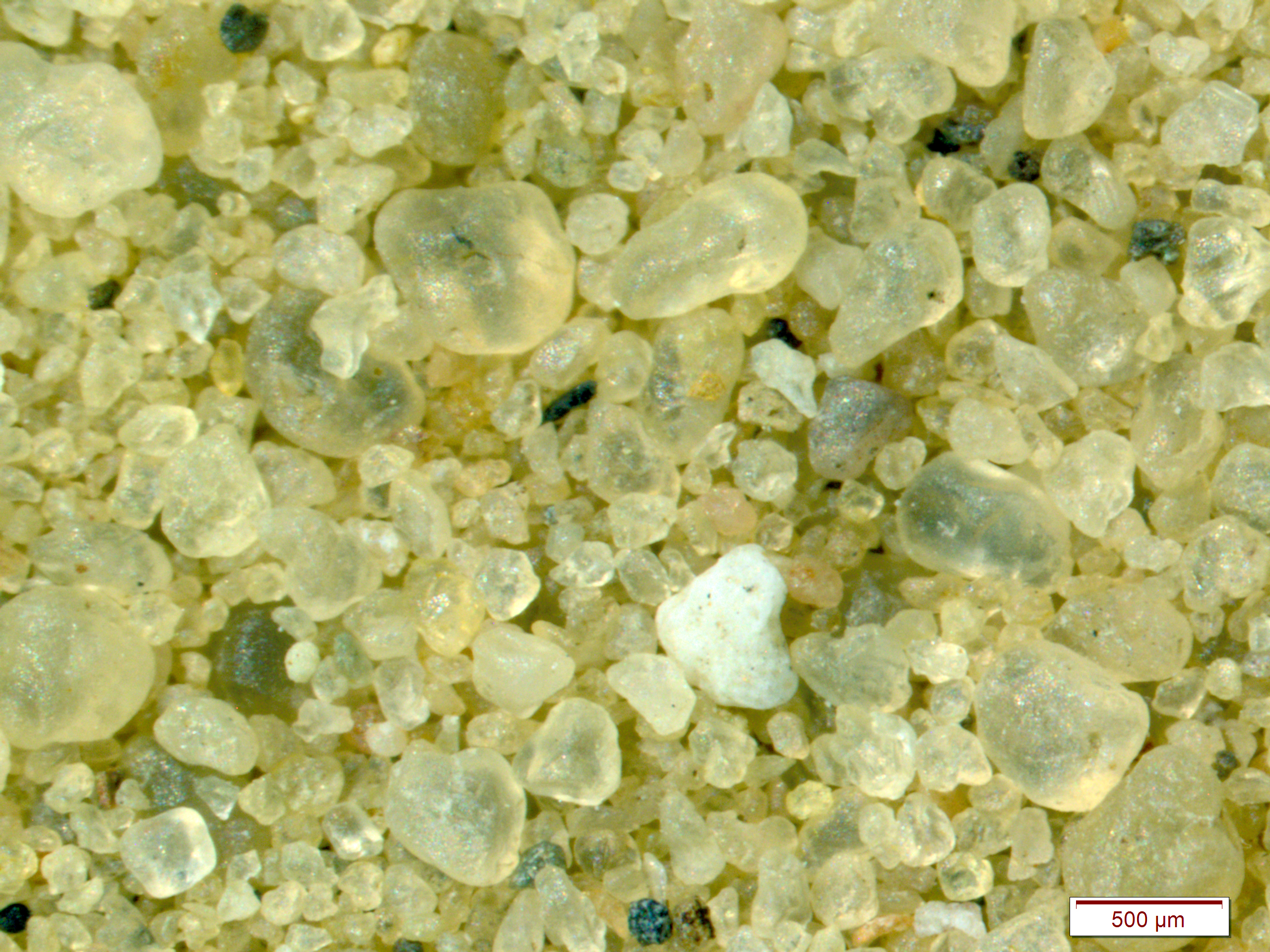
Quartz-rich sand from the Western Desert near Sakkara, Egypt.

The Great Sand Sea is a roughly lung-shaped area of sandy desert lying astride the border with Libya, 320 km (200 mi) inland from the Mediterranean. The sea is divided by a long peninsula of rocky desert along the border, leaving the eastern lobe in Egypt and the western in Libya, where it is called the Calanshio desert. On the Egyptian side it was known historically as the "Libyan Desert", taking its name from Ancient Libya, which lay between the Nile and Cyrenaica. With the formation of the state of Libya, the term "Western Desert" has come to describe the part of the Sahara in Egypt.

=== Boundaries ===
To the Ancient Greeks, the term Libya described the whole Saharan littoral west of the Nile to the Atlas Mountains. In Roman times, the term Libya was limited to Cyrenaica and the region between there and Egypt, organized as the provinces of Libya Superior and Libya Inferior. The term Libyan Desert then applied to the area to the south of these provinces. This became a misnomer during colonial times when Cyrenaica and the land to the west was organized as the Italian colony of Libya in 1911, and the term Western Desert used to describe the area within Egypt became more common.

Playfair described the Western Desert of 1940 as 390 km (240 mi) wide (i.e. from the Nile to the Libyan border) and 240 km (150 mi) from the Mediterranean to the latitude of Siwa Oasis, while the region to the south was referred to as the Inner Desert. However, during the Second World War the term Western Desert came to apply not only to the coastal desert of Egypt but also to the area fought over in Libya, ranging beyond the Egypt-Libya border to Gazala, Cyrenaica and even El Agheila.

The contemporary use of the term refers to the entire desert in Egypt west of the Nile.

== List of deserts ==
- Giza Plateau
- Great Sand Sea
- Black Desert
- White Desert

=== Giza Plateau ===
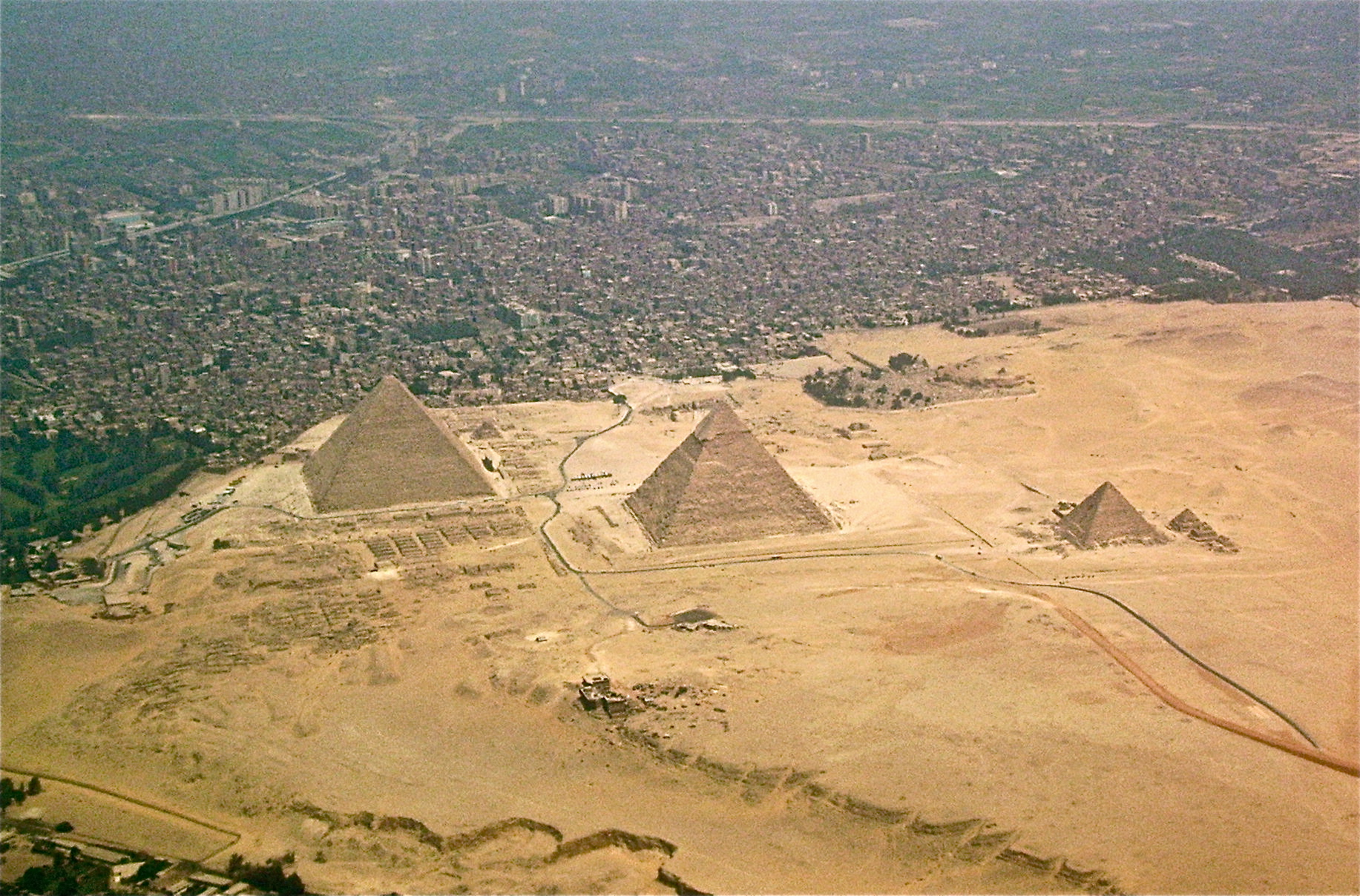
Overlook of the Giza Plateau and the Pyramids of Giza

The Giza Plateau (هضبة الجيزة) is a plateau in Giza, on the outskirts of Cairo, Egypt, at the edges of the Western Desert, site of the Fourth Dynasty Giza Necropolis, which includes the Great Pyramids of Khufu, Khafre and Menkaure, the Great Sphinx, several cemeteries, a workers' village and an industrial complex.

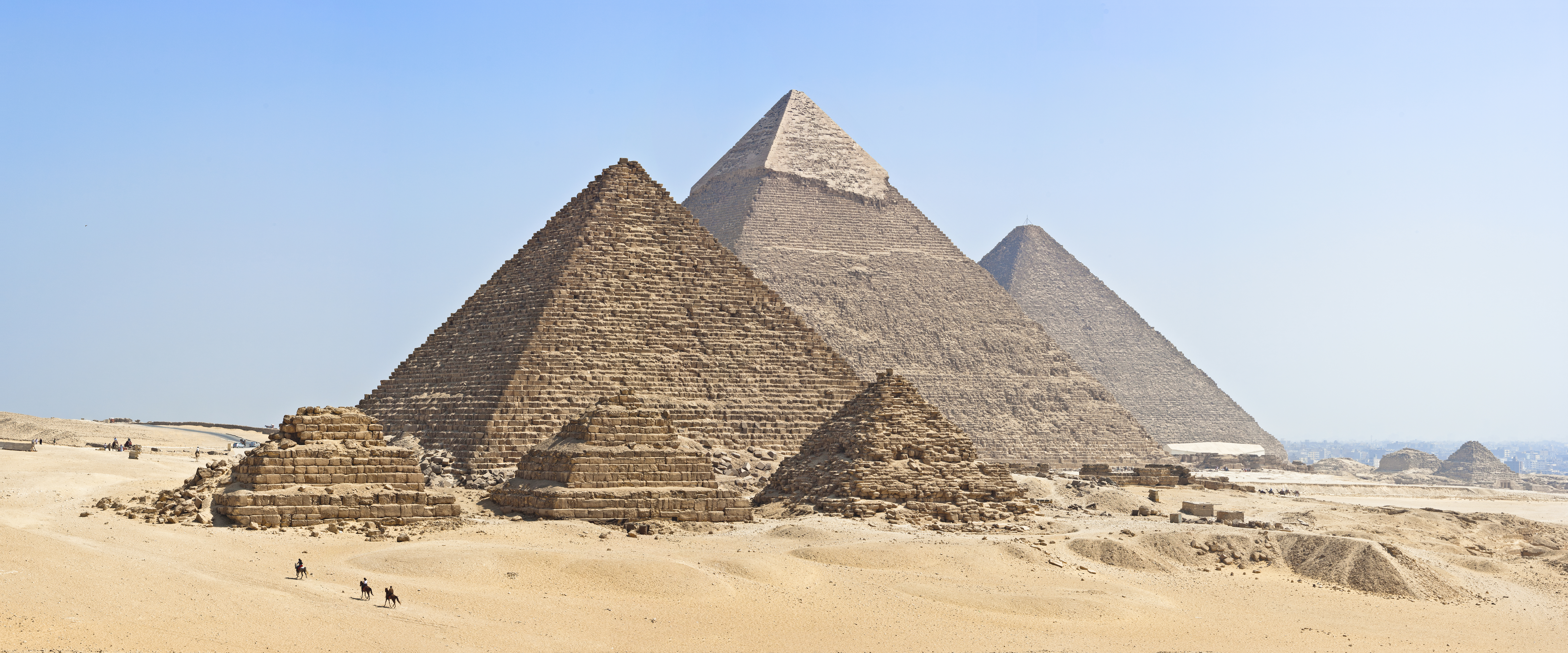
Pyramids of Giza

The Giza pyramid complex (مجمع أهرامات الجيزة), also called the Giza necropolis and also known as the Pyramids of Giza or Egypt, is the site on the Giza Plateau in Giza and Greater Cairo, Egypt that includes the Great Pyramid of Giza, the Pyramid of Khafre, and the Pyramid of Menkaure, along with their associated pyramid complexes and the Great Sphinx of Giza. All were built during the Fourth Dynasty of the Old Kingdom of Ancient Egypt, between 2600 and 2500 BC. The site also includes several cemeteries and the remains of a workers' village.

The Giza pyramid complex consists of the Great Pyramid (also known as the Pyramid of Cheops or Khufu and constructed c. 2580 – c. 2560 BC), the somewhat smaller Pyramid of Khafre (or Chephren) a few hundred metres to the south-west, and the relatively modest-sized Pyramid of Menkaure (or Mykerinos) a few hundred metres farther south-west. The Great Sphinx lies on the east side of the complex. Current consensus among Egyptologists is that the head of the Great Sphinx is that of Khafre. Along with these major monuments are a number of smaller satellite edifices, known as "queens" pyramids, causeways and valley pyramids.

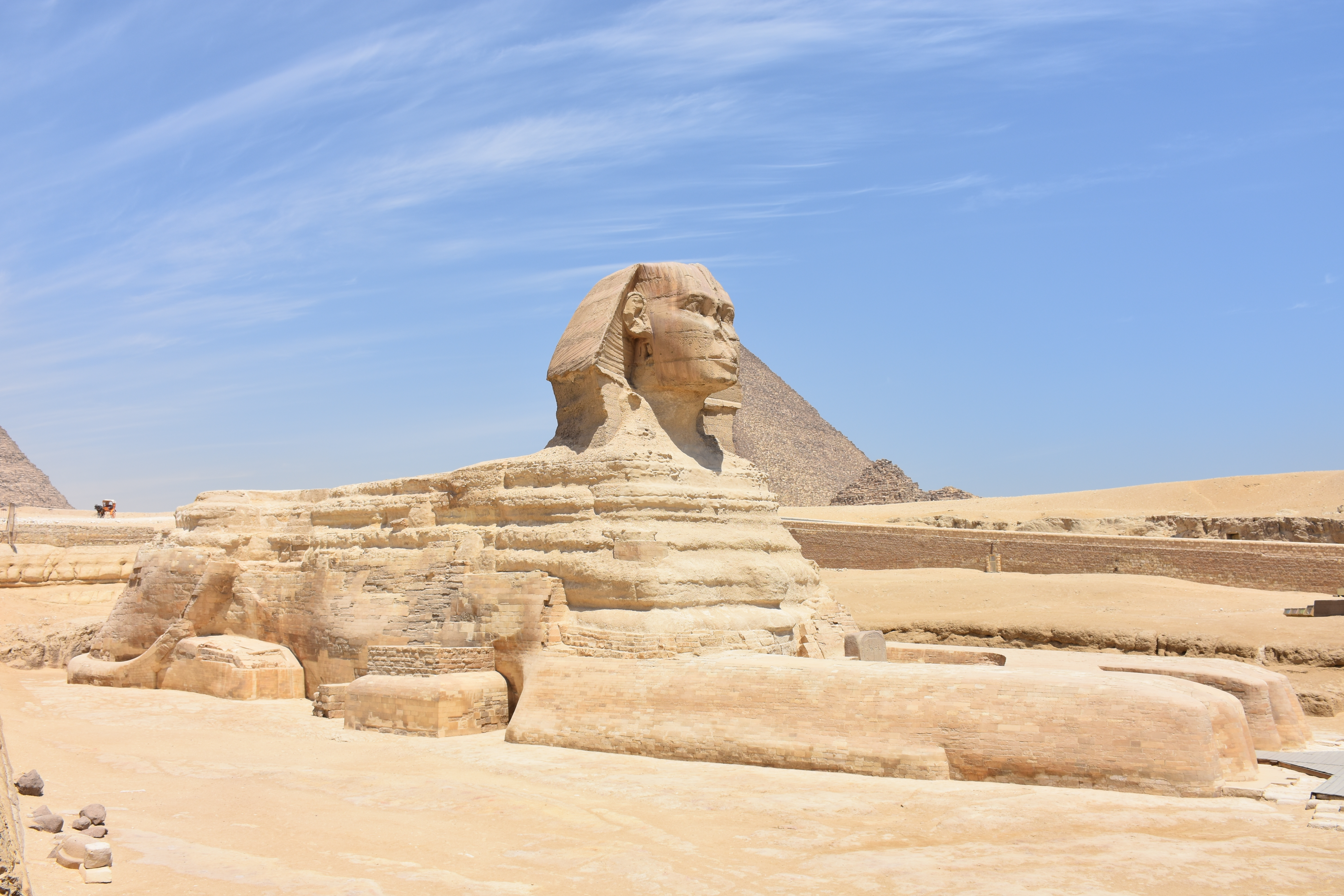
Great Sphinx of Giza

The Great Sphinx of Giza is a limestone statue of a reclining sphinx, a mythical creature with the head of a human, and the body of a lion. Facing directly from west to east, it stands on the Giza Plateau on the west bank of the Nile in Giza, Egypt. The face of the Sphinx appears to represent the pharaoh Khafre.

The original shape of the Sphinx was cut from the bedrock, and has since been restored with layers of limestone blocks. It measures 73 m (240 ft) long from paw to tail, 20 m (66 ft) high from the base to the top of the head and 19 m (62 ft) wide at its rear haunches. Its nose was broken off for unknown reasons between the 3rd and 10th centuries AD.

The Sphinx is the oldest known monumental sculpture in Egypt and one of the most recognisable statues in the world. The archaeological evidence suggests that it was created by ancient Egyptians of the Old Kingdom during the reign of Khafre (c. 2558–2532 BC).

=== Great Sand Sea ===
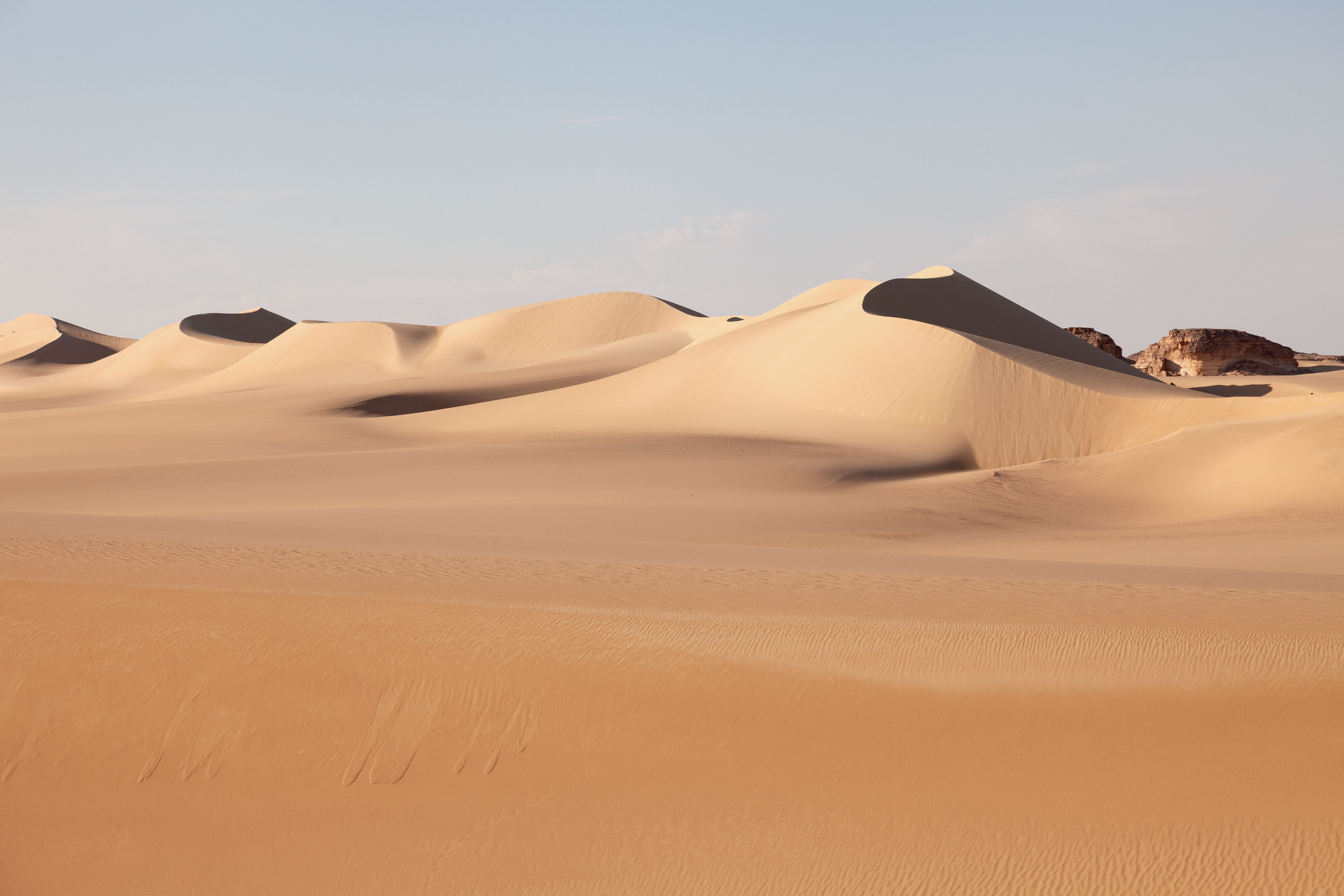
The dunes of the Great Sand Sea

The Great Sand Sea is a desert in the Sahara between western Egypt and eastern Libya in North Africa, 74% of the area is covered by sand dunes.

The Great Sand Sea stretches about 650 km (400 mi) from north to south and 300 km (190 mi) from east to west. On satellite images this desert shows a pattern of long sand ridges running in a roughly north–south direction. However, despite the apparent uniformity the Great Sand Sea has two large areas with different types of megadunes. The Egyptian sand sea lies parallel to the Calanshio Sand Sea of Libya, with which it is contiguous in the north. The dunes of the Great Sand Sea cover about 10% of the total area of the Western Desert.

=== Black Desert ===
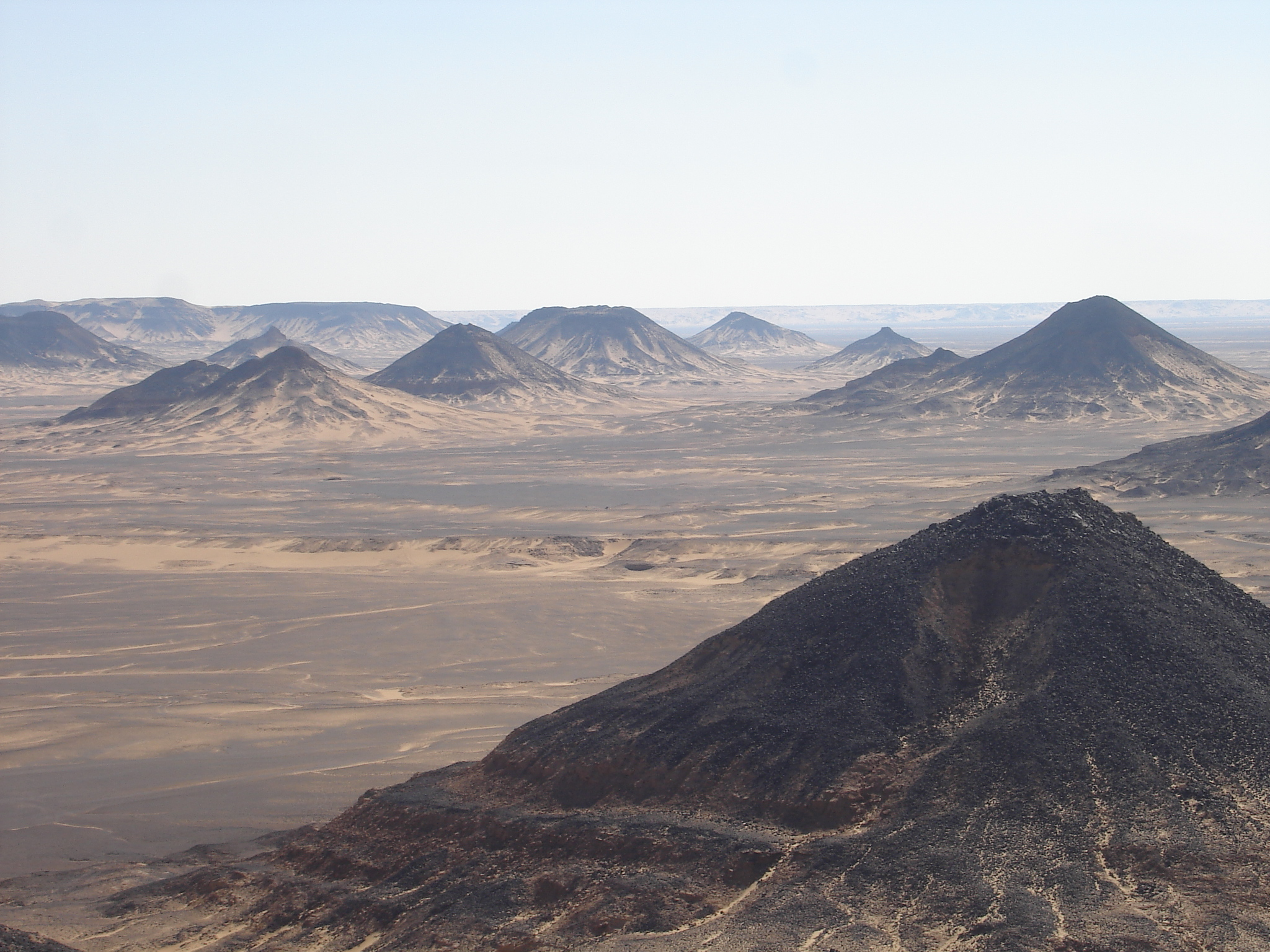
Volcano-shaped mounds of the Black Desert

The Black Desert (الصحراء السوداء) is a region of volcano-shaped and widely spaced mounds, distributed along about 30 km (19 mi) in the Western Desert between the White Desert in the south and the Bahariya Oasis in the north. Most of its mounds are capped by basalt sills, giving them the characteristic black color.

The mounds of the Black Desert, up to 100 metres (330 feet) high, vary in size, composition, height, and shape as some are dark consisting of iron quartzite while others are more reddish as its surface rocks consist of iron sandstone. On the outskirts of the Black Desert are volcanic hills proving the eruption of dark volcanic dolerite, dating back to the Jurassic period 180 million years ago.

=== White Desert ===
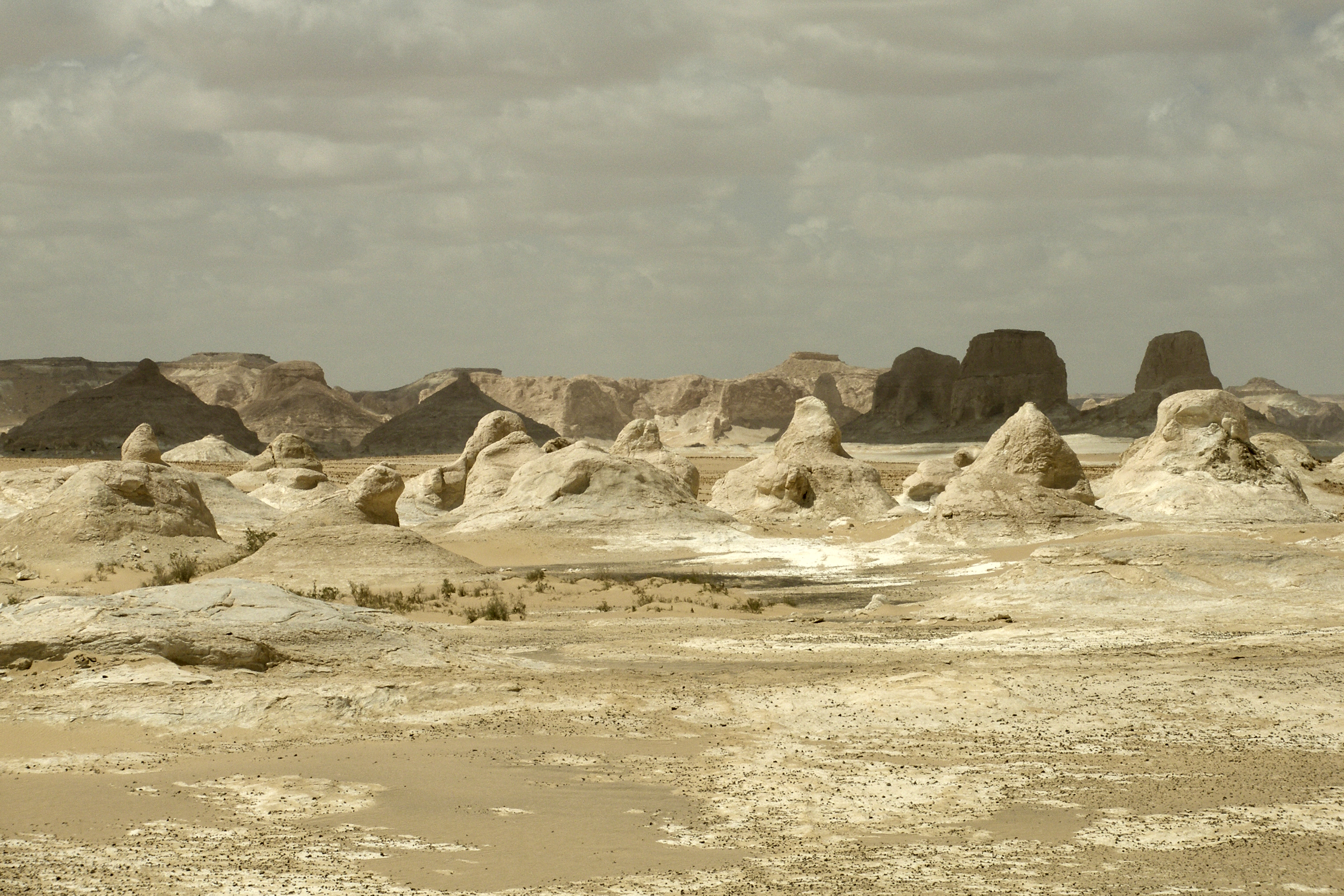
The White Desert is a site of cliffs, dunes and large white chalk rock formations, created through erosion by wind and sand.

The White Desert is a national park, first established as a protected area in 2002. It is located in the Farafra depression, 45 km (28 mi) north of the town of Qsar El Farafra. Part of the park is in the Farafra Oasis (New Valley Governorate).

The park is the site of large white chalk rock formations, created through erosion by wind and sand. It is also the site of cliffs (at the northern end of the Farafra Depression), sand dunes (part of the Great Sand Sea), as well as Wadi Hennis and oases at Ain El Maqfi and Ain El Wadi.

The park serves as the refuge for various animals, including the endangered Rhim gazelle and the vulnerable Dorcas gazelle, as well as Barbary sheep; jackals; Rüppell's, red and fennec foxes; and the sand cat.

== History ==
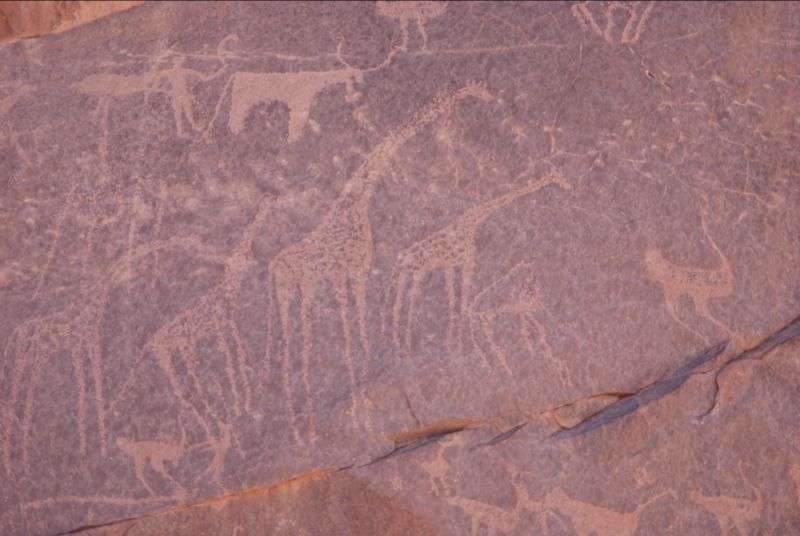
Rock carvings at Gilf Kebir

In pre-historic times the Western desert is thought to have been a semi-arid grassland, home to savanna animals and hunter-gatherers; evidence of abundant wildlife can be found in the cave paintings of the Gilf Kebir. It is thought that over-grazing and climate change led to desertification and the current geography. Even after this, however, the oases remained inhabited, and the Antiquities Museum at Kharga has artifacts dating back to times before the early Egyptian kingdoms.

In ancient times the area was regarded as being under the jurisdiction of the kingdom of Egypt, and Egyptian remains can be found in all the oases. In 525 BC, the Lost Army of Cambyses, a military expedition by the Persian king Cambyses II got lost in the desert while searching for the Oracle of Ammon, at Siwa. In 333 the Oracle of Ammon was visited by Alexander the Great, where he was confirmed as the son of Amun.

With the absorption of the kingdom of Egypt into the Roman Empire, the desert region was organized into the province of Libya Inferior, while Cyrenaica became Libya Superior. In time the region came under the jurisdiction of the Byzantines and their successors, the Arabs, Mamluks and Turks. In 1882 the kingdom of Egypt became a British protectorate, and in 1912 the territory to the east was claimed by Italy as the colony of Libya.

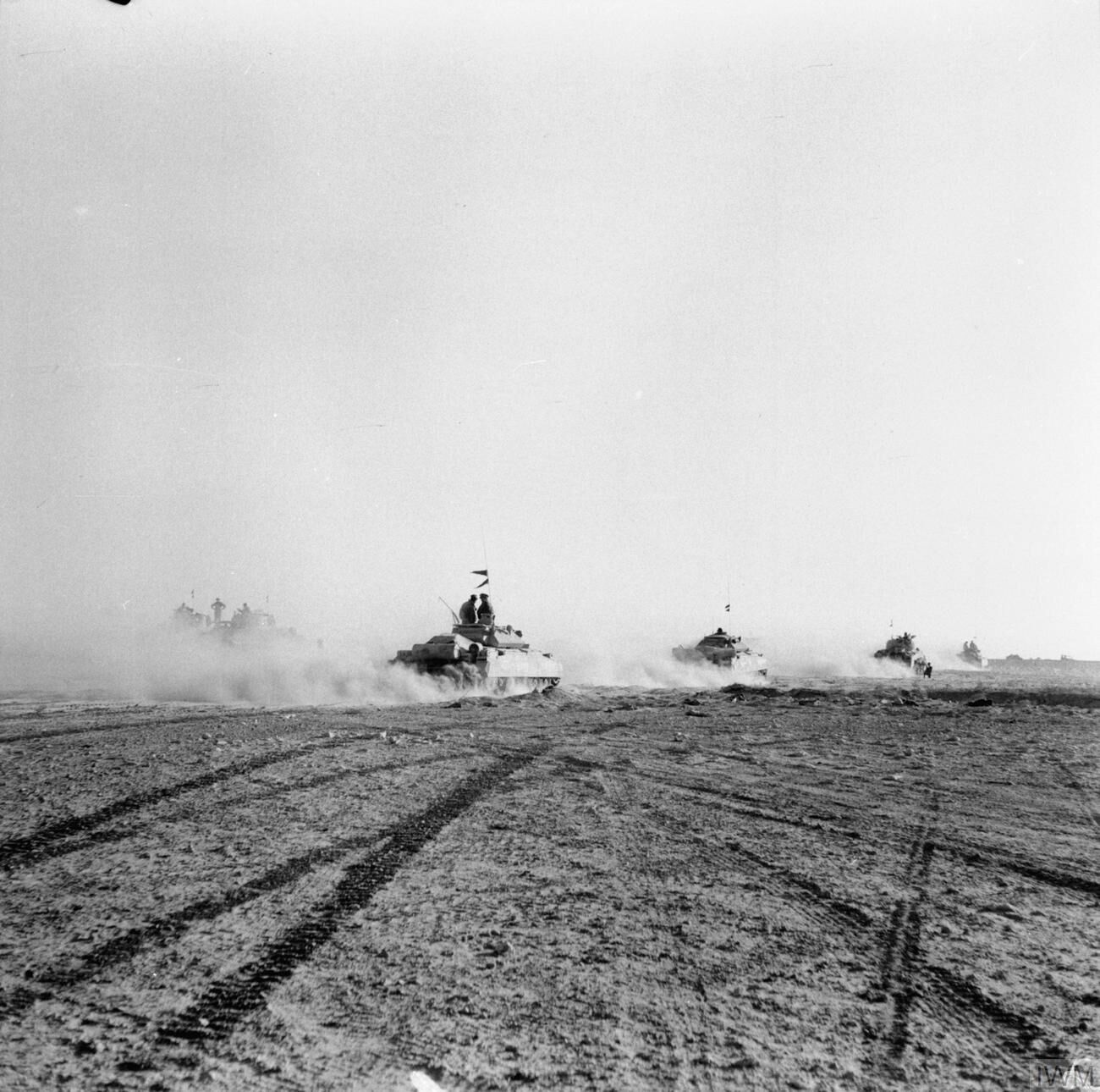
Tank engagement during the Western Desert Campaign

In the 20th century the Western Desert became an arena of conflict; during the First World War it was the location of the Senussi Campaign against the British and Italians. The 1930s saw an upsurge of exploration and mapping expeditions by British Army officers, such as Ralph Bagnold and Pat Clayton, laying the basis for war-time operations by such forces as the Long Range Desert Group. This period was also marked by the search for Zerzura, a mythical oasis in the deep desert. During the Second World War, from June 1940 until November 1942, it was the location of the Western Desert Campaign fought between the Axis powers (Italy and Germany) and the Western Allies (principally Britain and Commonwealth countries, a total of 15 nations) until the Allied victory in November 1942.

In modern times the Egyptian government has encouraged settlements in the oases, and surveyed for minerals, particularly oil.

=== Toshka Project ===
In October 2020, President Abdul Fattah el-Sisi ordered the revival of an ambitious decades old agricultural project once named the Toshka Project (aka the New Valley Project), aimed at creating a new delta in the middle of Western Desert and increasing living space and prosperity for Egypt's growing population. President El-Sisi specified that 6.4 billion Egyptian pounds ($413 million) would be needed for the necessary infrastructure, breathing new life into national hopes for turning the desert green. Originally, Project Toshka was spear-headed by former President Hosni Mubarak, who spent 40 billion Egyptian pounds on the project, establishing the necessary electricity plants and water pumping stations. A few years later, however, the project came to a sudden halt, with failure being attributed to the lack of political will and necessary investments.
