= Black Desert (Egypt) =

Black Desert الصحراء السوداء
- Desert
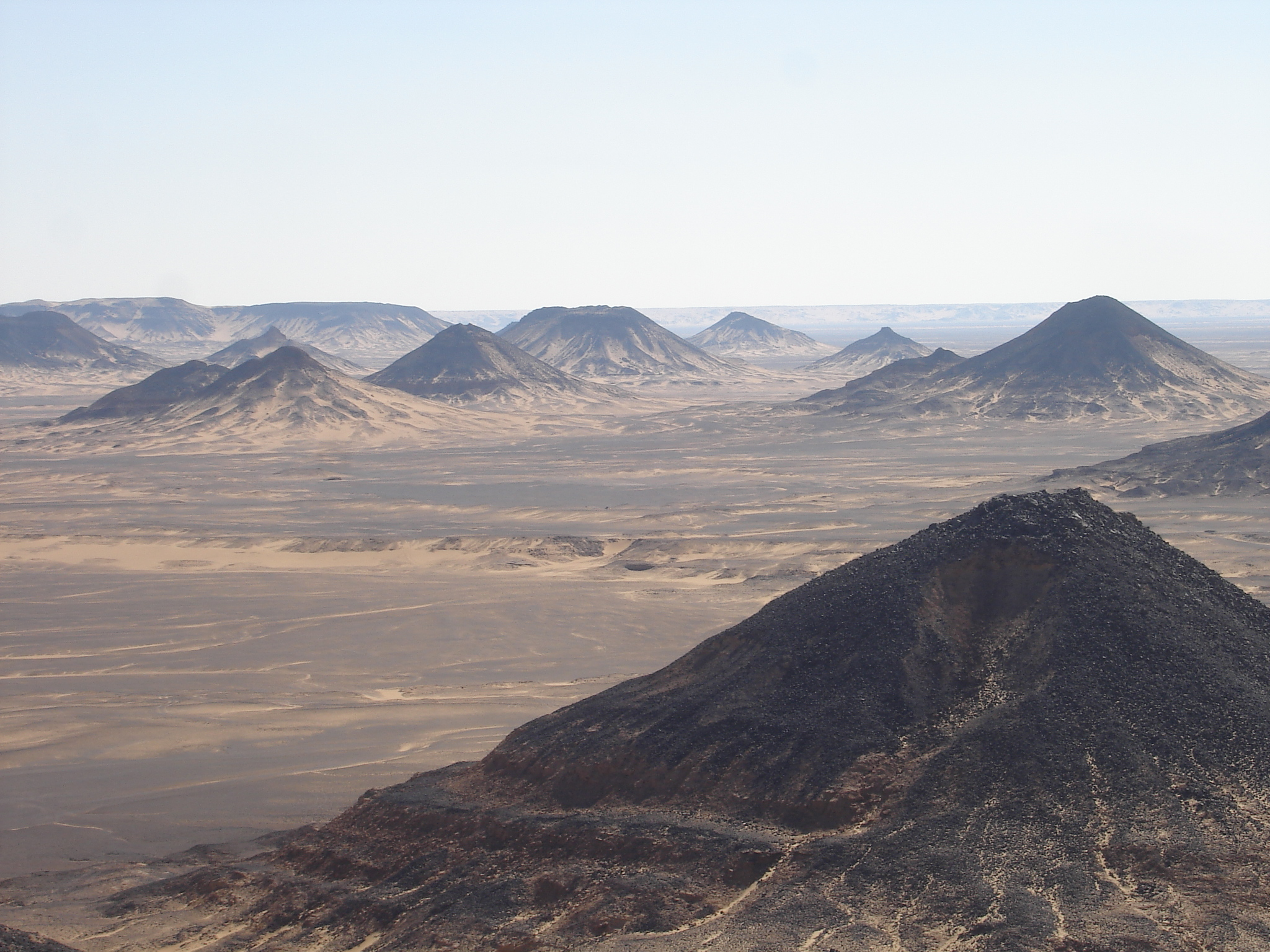
- Volcano-shaped mounds of the Black Desert

- Location in Egypt
- Coordinates: 28.150711°N 28.728561°E
- Country: Egypt
- Governorate: Giza Governorate

Dimensions
  - Length: 30 km (19 mi)
- Elevation: 100 m (330 ft)

The Black Desert (Arabic: الصحراء السوداء, romanized: aṣ-Ṣaḥrāʾ as-sawdāʾ) is a region of volcano-shaped and widely spaced mounds, distributed along about 30 km (19 mi) in the Western Desert of Egypt between the White Desert in the south and the Bahariya Oasis in the north. Most of its mounds are capped by basalt sills, giving them the characteristic black color.

== Geology ==
The mounds of the Black Desert, up to 100 metres (328 feet) high, vary in size, composition, height, and shape. Some are dark, consisting of iron quartzite, while others are more reddish, as their surface rocks consist of iron sandstone. On the outskirts of the Black Desert are volcanic hills that prove the eruption of dark volcanic dolerite, dating back to the Jurassic period 180 million years ago.

== Palaeobiology ==
Remains of shrubs and fossilized woodlands have been found in the Black Desert, indicating that plants once grew there.

== Declaration of Natural Reserve ==
After the discovery of the second-largest dinosaur skeleton in the world on its borders, the Black Desert was declared a natural reserve in 2010.

== In popular culture ==
The Black Desert has inspired the setting of the Valencia region in the fantasy MMORPG Black Desert Online.

The Black Desert serves as a playable region in the 2017 action-adventure game Assassin's Creed: Origins.
