= Farafra, Egypt =

Farafra
- Depression
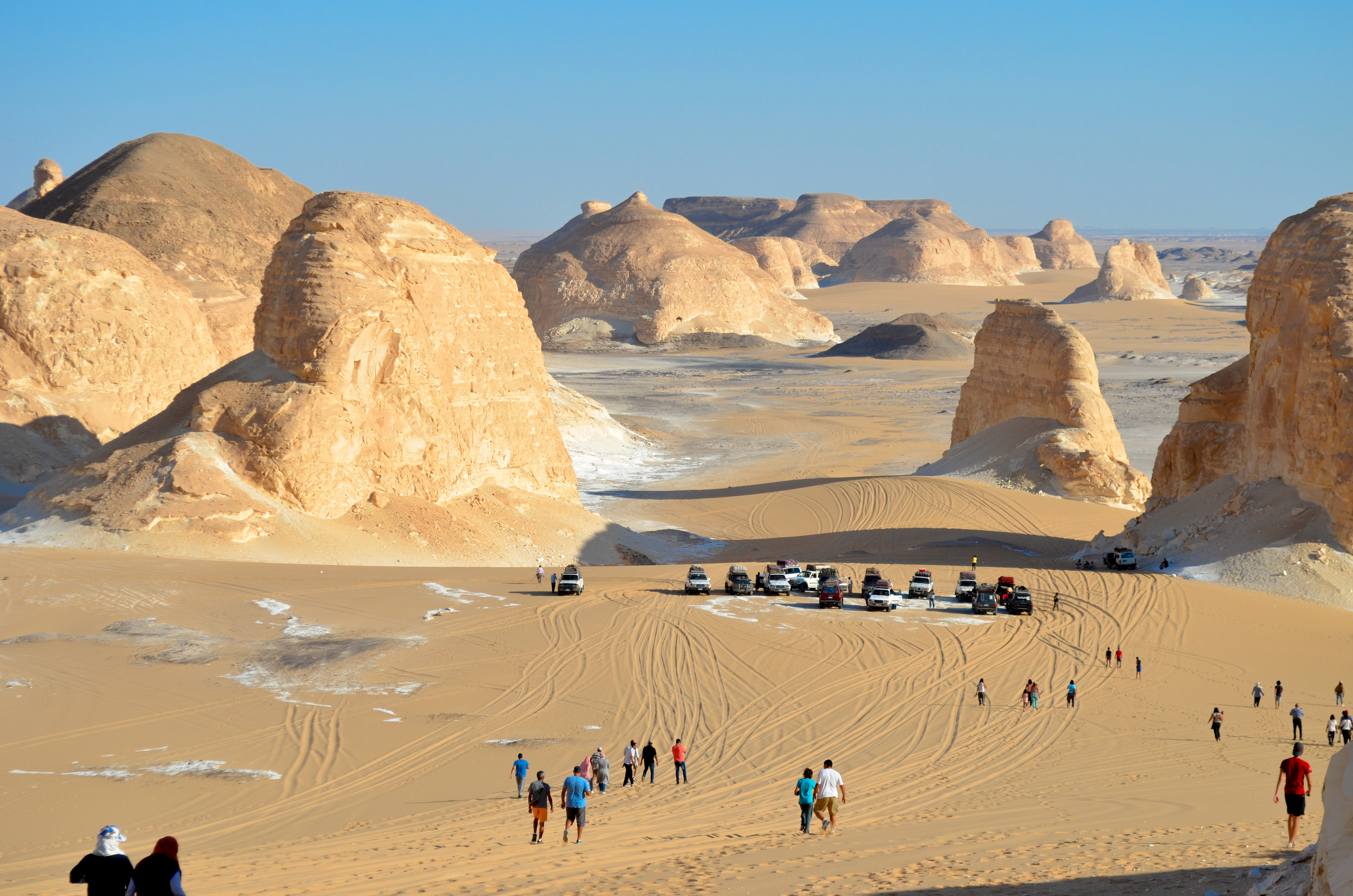
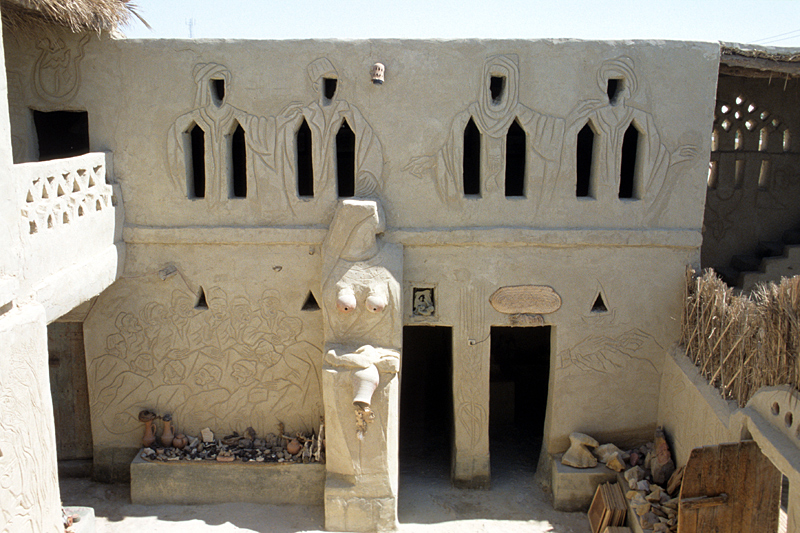
- View to the White Desert near the town, Badr Museum in its old town.

- Location in Egypt
- Coordinates: 27°03′30″N 27°58′12″E
- Country: Egypt
- Governorate: New Valley Governorate
- Time zone: UTC+2 (EET)
  - Summer (DST): UTC+3 (EEST)

The Farafra depression (Arabic: واحة الفرافرة, pronounced [elfɑˈɾɑfɾɑ]) is a 980 km^{2} (380 sq mi) geological depression, the second largest by size in Western Egypt and the smallest by population, near latitude 27.06° north and longitude 27.97° east. It is in the large Western Desert of Egypt, approximately midway between the Dakhla and Bahariya oases.

Farafra has an estimated 5,000 inhabitants (2002) mainly living in the town of Farafra and is mostly inhabited by the local Bedouins. Parts of the town have complete quarters of traditional architecture, simple, smooth, unadorned, all in mud colour—local culture and traditional methods of building and carrying out repairs have been supported by its tourism. Often grouped within Farafra are the hot springs at Bir Sitta (the sixth well) and the El-Mufid lake.

== Etymology ==
The word al-Farafra (al-Farafira in local pronunciation, Arabic: الفرفرون al-Farfarun in Middle Ages) is a broken plural form of Arabic: فرفر farfar meaning "fizzy spring". The oasis was called in Ancient Egyptian: tꜣ jḥw, "the land of cattle".

== History ==
tA N23 Z1 E1 Z1 Z1 Z1 xAst
tꜣ jḥw
in hieroglyphs
Era: Middle Kingdom
(2055–1650 BC)

N17 i H E1 t niwt
tꜣ jḥw(t)
in hieroglyphs
Era: Ptolemaic dynasty
(305–30 BC)

Archaeological evidence suggests that Farafra region has been inhabited since late Pleistocene. Farafra was known in ancient Egyptian history at least since the Middle Kingdom. In the Ptolemaic period, the region was under the administration of the Oxyrhynchite nome (19th Upper Egyptian nome).

== White Desert ==
A main geographic attraction of Farafra is its White Desert (known as Sahara el Beyda)—a national park of Egypt and 45 km (28 mi) north of the town of Farafra, the main draw of which is its rock type colored from snow-white to cream. It has massive chalk rock formations that are textbook examples of ventifact and which have been created as a result of occasional sandstorm in the area. The White Desert is a typical place visited by some schools in Egypt, as a location for camping trips.

== Wells ==
The Roman spring of Ain Bishay bubbles forth from a hillock on the northwest edge of town. It has been developed into an irrigated grove of date palms together with citrus, olive, apricot and carob trees, and is a cool haven amid the arid landscape. Several families tend the crops here; you should seek someone out and ask permission before wandering around.

— Sights in Qasr Al Farafra - Lonely Planet

Due to its geographical location and geological formation it has more than 100 wells spread out over the lands of the Farafra, many of which are natural. Most of these wells are used in aggregation of the cultivated land in the oasis. Some of the wells in Farafra have become favorite tourist destinations. Bir Sitta, (well 6 in Arabic), Bir Sab'a (well 7) and Bir Ithnian wa ishrin (well 22) are the most important. Because of the water's warm temperature and a slight percentage of sulfur, these wells are favorable for swimming and relaxation. There is a large lake touristic well named Abu Nus 15 kilometers north of the edge of the Farafra.

== Climate ==
Köppen-Geiger climate classification system classifies its climate as hot desert (BWh).

Climate data for Farafra, Egypt
Month	Jan	Feb	Mar	Apr	May	Jun	Jul	Aug	Sep	Oct	Nov	Dec	Year
Record high °C (°F)	31.8 (89.2)	37.2 (99.0)	41.5 (106.7)	46.4 (115.5)	47.5 (117.5)	47.8 (118.0)	44.7 (112.5)	45.1 (113.2)	43.4 (110.1)	42.6 (108.7)	37.8 (100.0)	31.2 (88.2)	47.8 (118.0)
Mean daily maximum °C (°F)	20.0 (68.0)	22.4 (72.3)	26.2 (79.2)	31.6 (88.9)	35.4 (95.7)	37.8 (100.0)	37.8 (100.0)	37.3 (99.1)	35.1 (95.2)	31.2 (88.2)	25.5 (77.9)	21.1 (70.0)	30.1 (86.2)
Daily mean °C (°F)	12.0 (53.6)	14.0 (57.2)	17.8 (64.0)	22.8 (73.0)	27.0 (80.6)	29.4 (84.9)	30.3 (86.5)	29.9 (85.8)	27.2 (81.0)	23.1 (73.6)	17.6 (63.7)	13.6 (56.5)	22.1 (71.8)
Mean daily minimum °C (°F)	4.1 (39.4)	6.0 (42.8)	9.2 (48.6)	13.8 (56.8)	17.9 (64.2)	20.6 (69.1)	21.9 (71.4)	21.5 (70.7)	19.5 (67.1)	15.6 (60.1)	10.1 (50.2)	5.6 (42.1)	13.8 (56.8)
Record low °C (°F)	−3.3 (26.1)	−2.2 (28.0)	−0.2 (31.6)	2.9 (37.2)	7.6 (45.7)	13.9 (57.0)	16.9 (62.4)	16.8 (62.2)	13.5 (56.3)	7.3 (45.1)	0.6 (33.1)	−2.1 (28.2)	−3.3 (26.1)
Average precipitation mm (inches)	1 (0.0)	0 (0)	0 (0)	0 (0)	0 (0)	0 (0)	0 (0)	0 (0)	0 (0)	0 (0)	1 (0.0)	0 (0)	2 (0.1)
Average precipitation days (≥ 1.0 mm)	0.1	0.1	0	0.1	0	0	0	0	0	0	0	0	0.3
Average relative humidity (%)	51	43	38	29	26	26	28	31	36	42	55	53	38.2
Source 1: NOAA
Source 2: Climate Charts

== Gallery ==
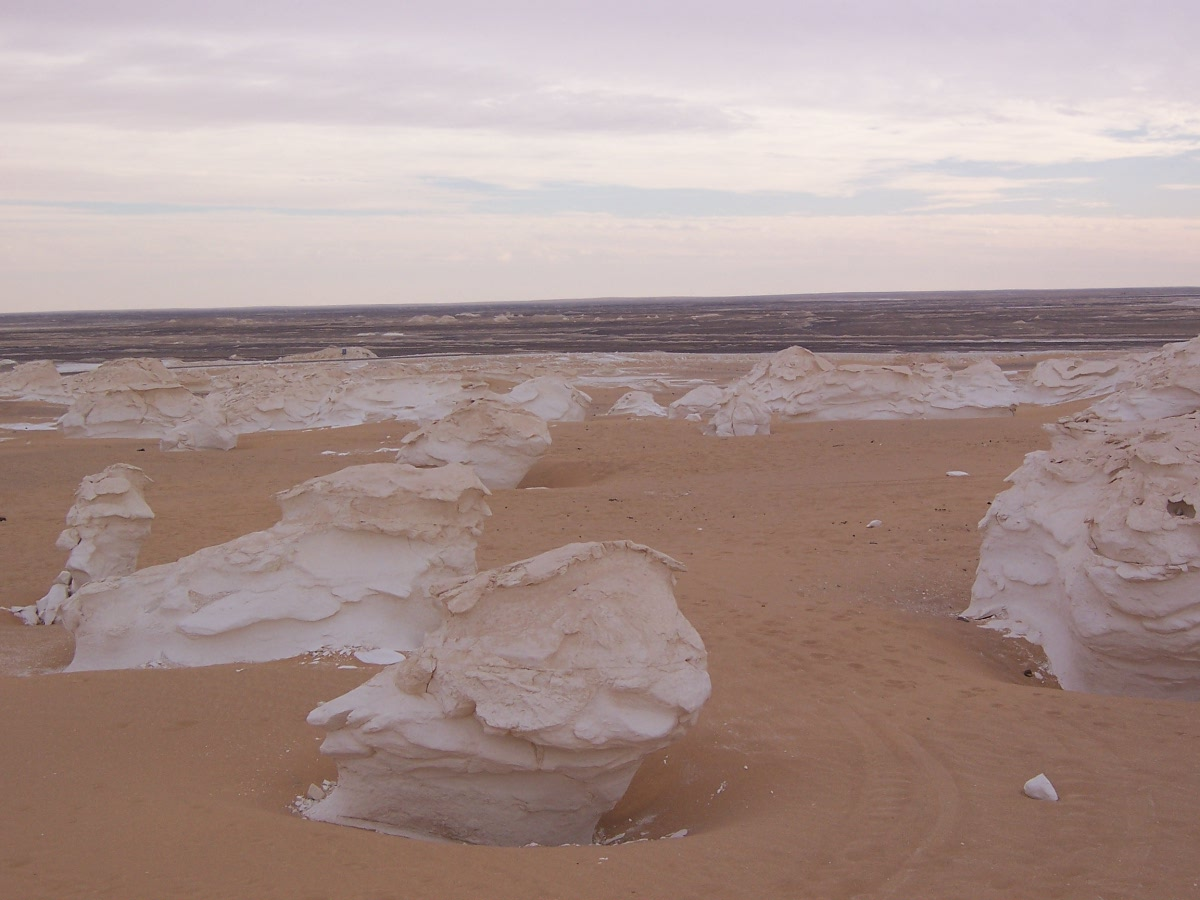

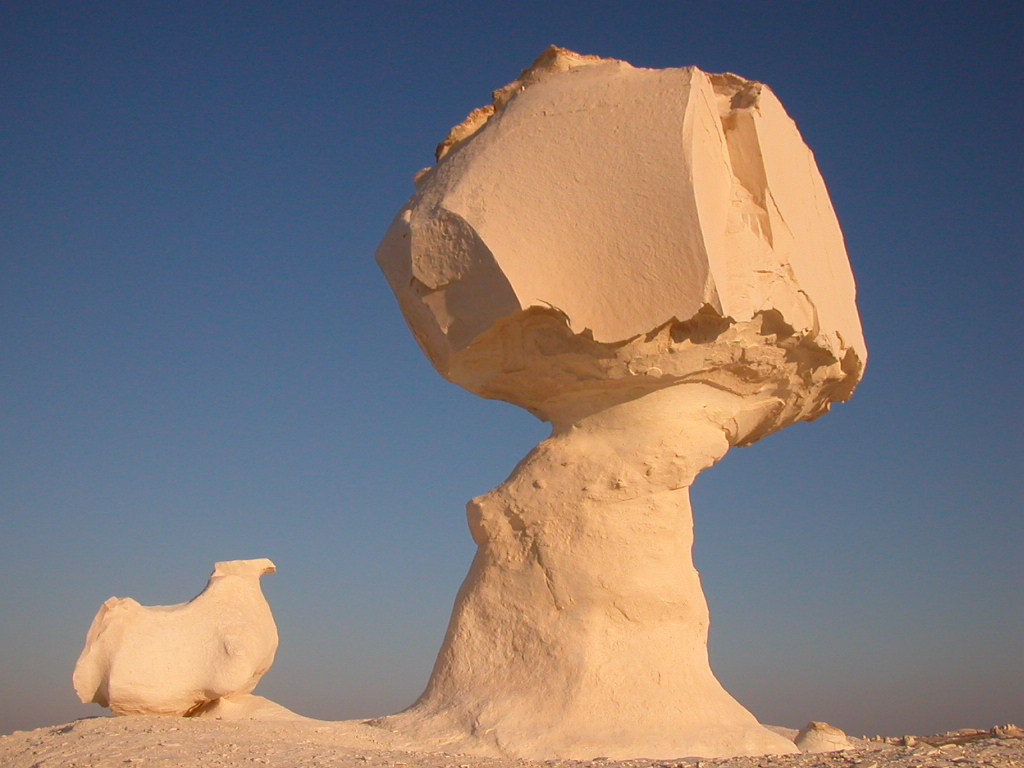
Limestone rock formation

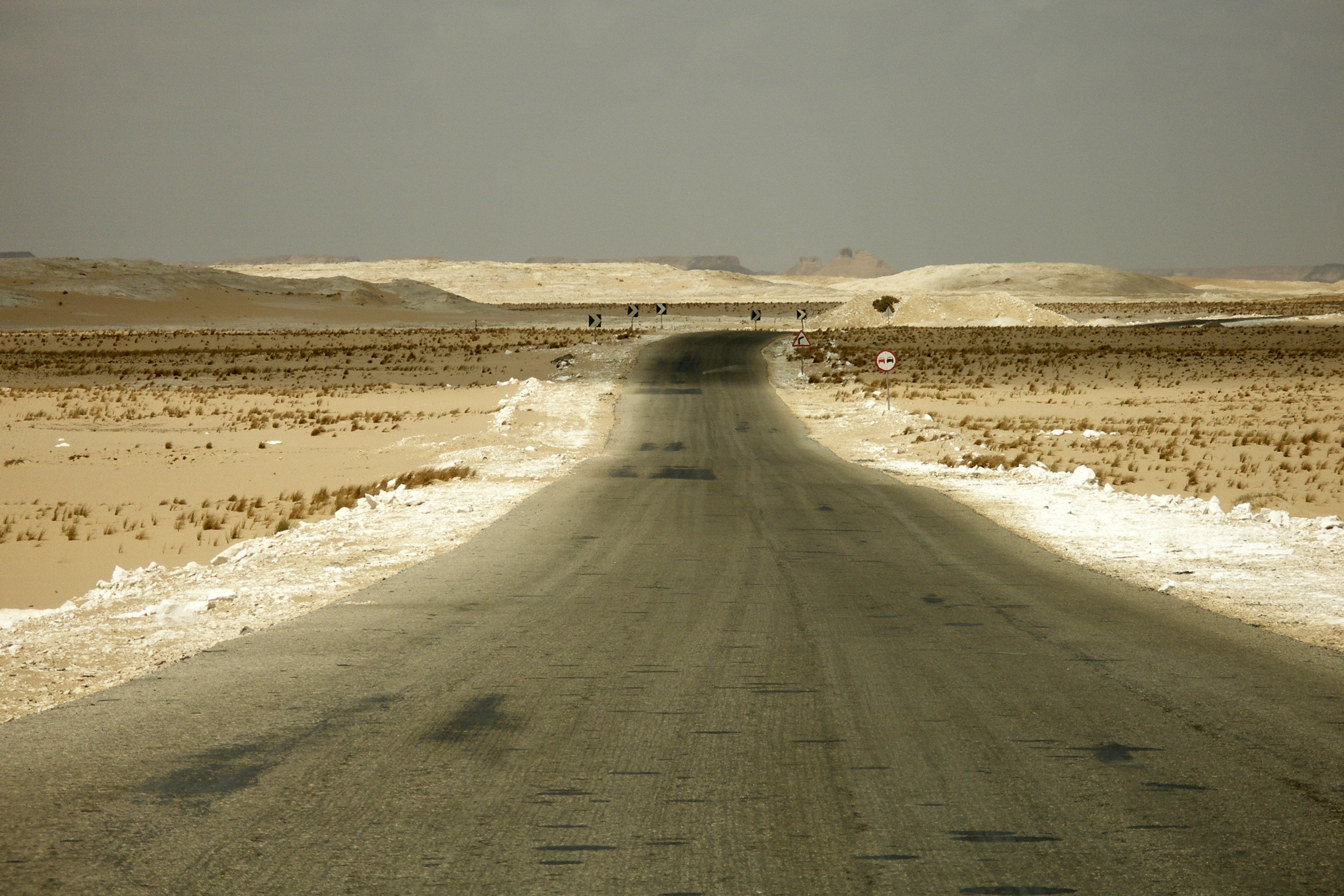
Al-Farafra – Al-Bahariya road

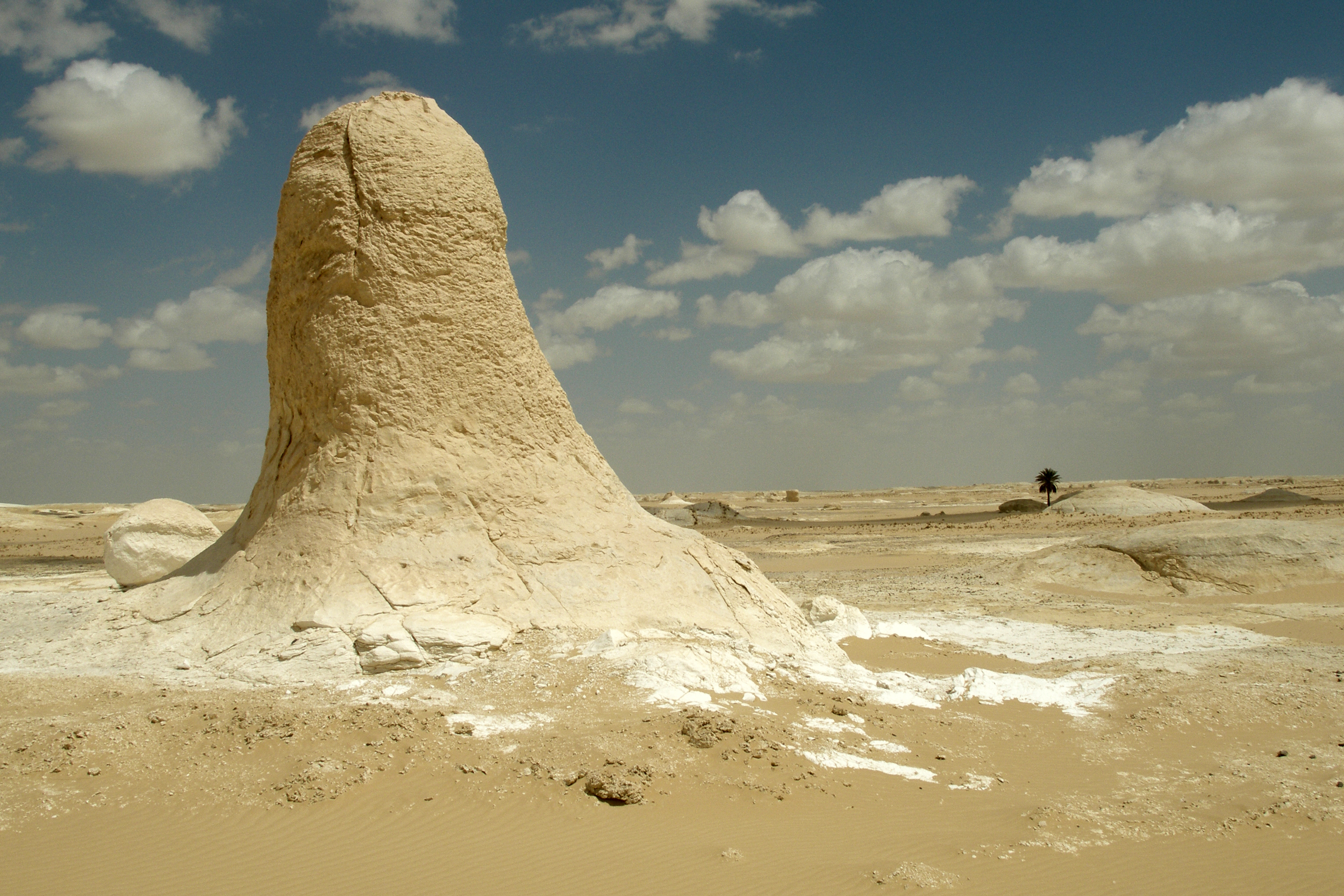
Rock formation

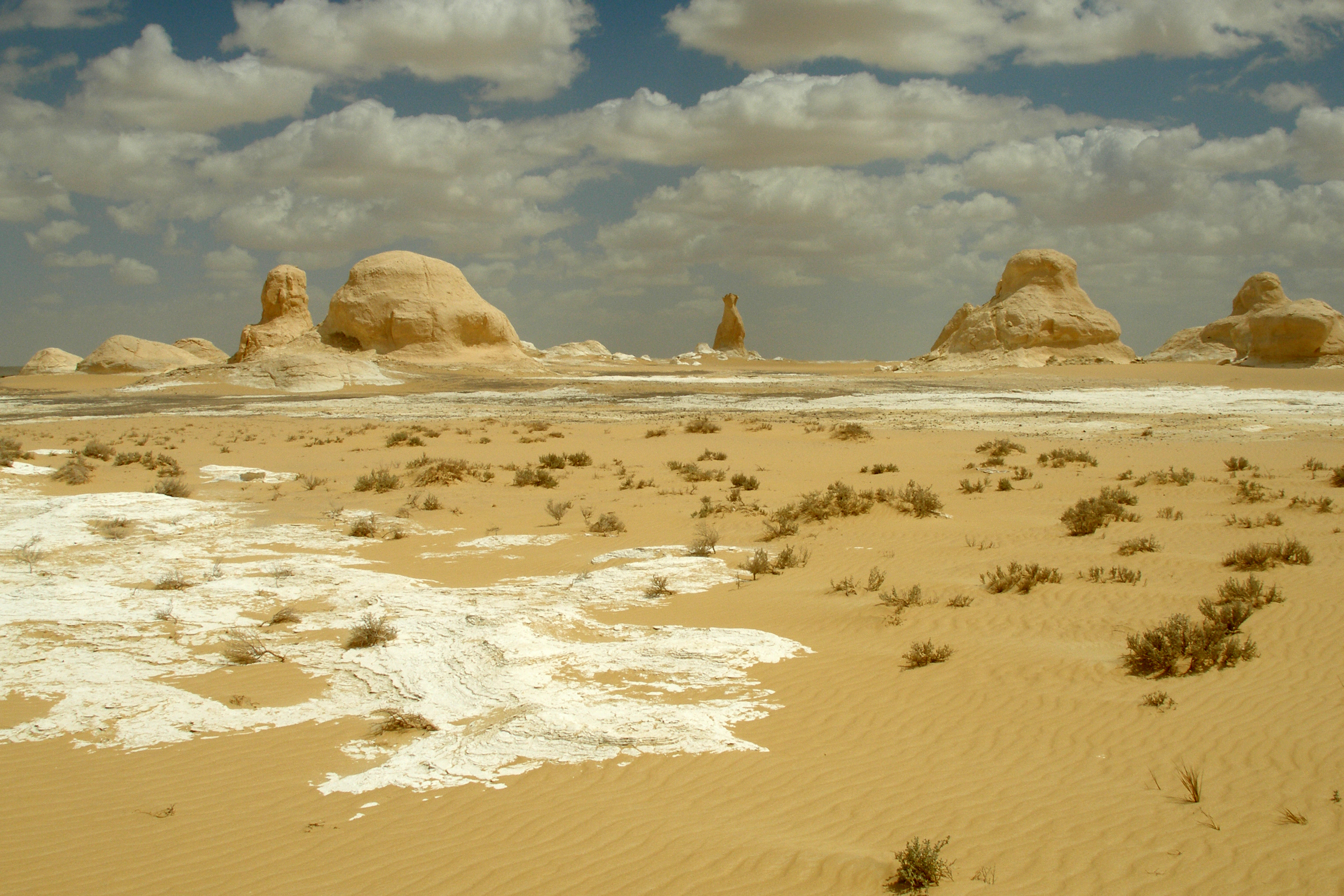
Rock formations

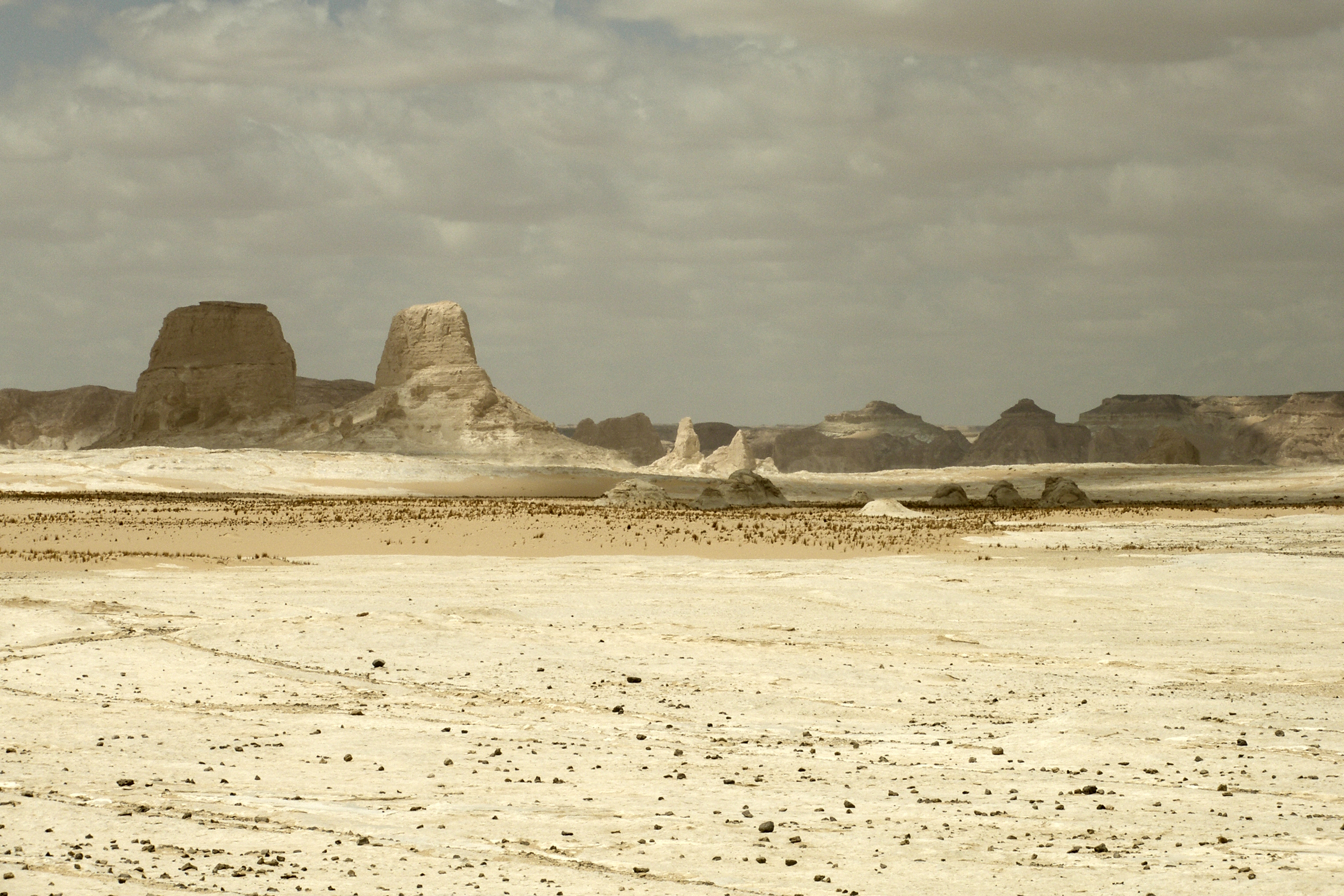
Distant view
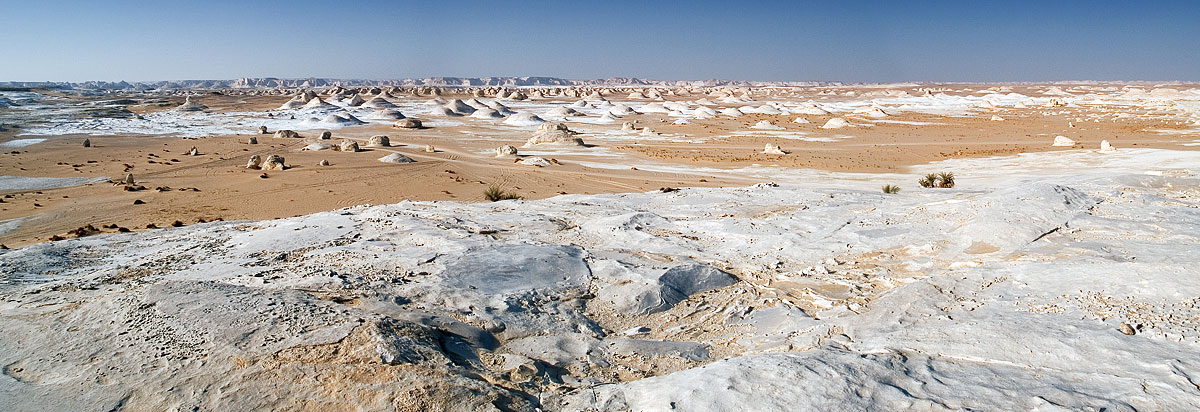
Panorama of the White Desert of Egypt

== Bibliography ==
- Beadnell, Hugh J. L. (1901). The Farafra Oasis: Its Topography and Geology. Geological Survey Report Part III. Egypt. Maṣlaḥat al-Misāḥah.
- Bliss, Frank (1998). 'Artisanat et artisanat d’art dans les oasis du désert occidental égyptien'. "Veröffentlichungen des Frobenius-Instituts". Cologne.
- Bliss, Frank (2006). 'Oasenleben. Die ägyptischen Oasen Bahriya und Farafra in Vergangenheit und Gegenwart'. Die ägyptischen Oasen Band 2. Bonn.
- Fakhry, Ahmed (1974). Bahriyah and Farafra. Reissue of the Classic History and Description. Illustrated, reprint. Publisher: American Univ. in Cairo Press. ISBN 9774247329, ISBN 9789774247323. 189 pages.
