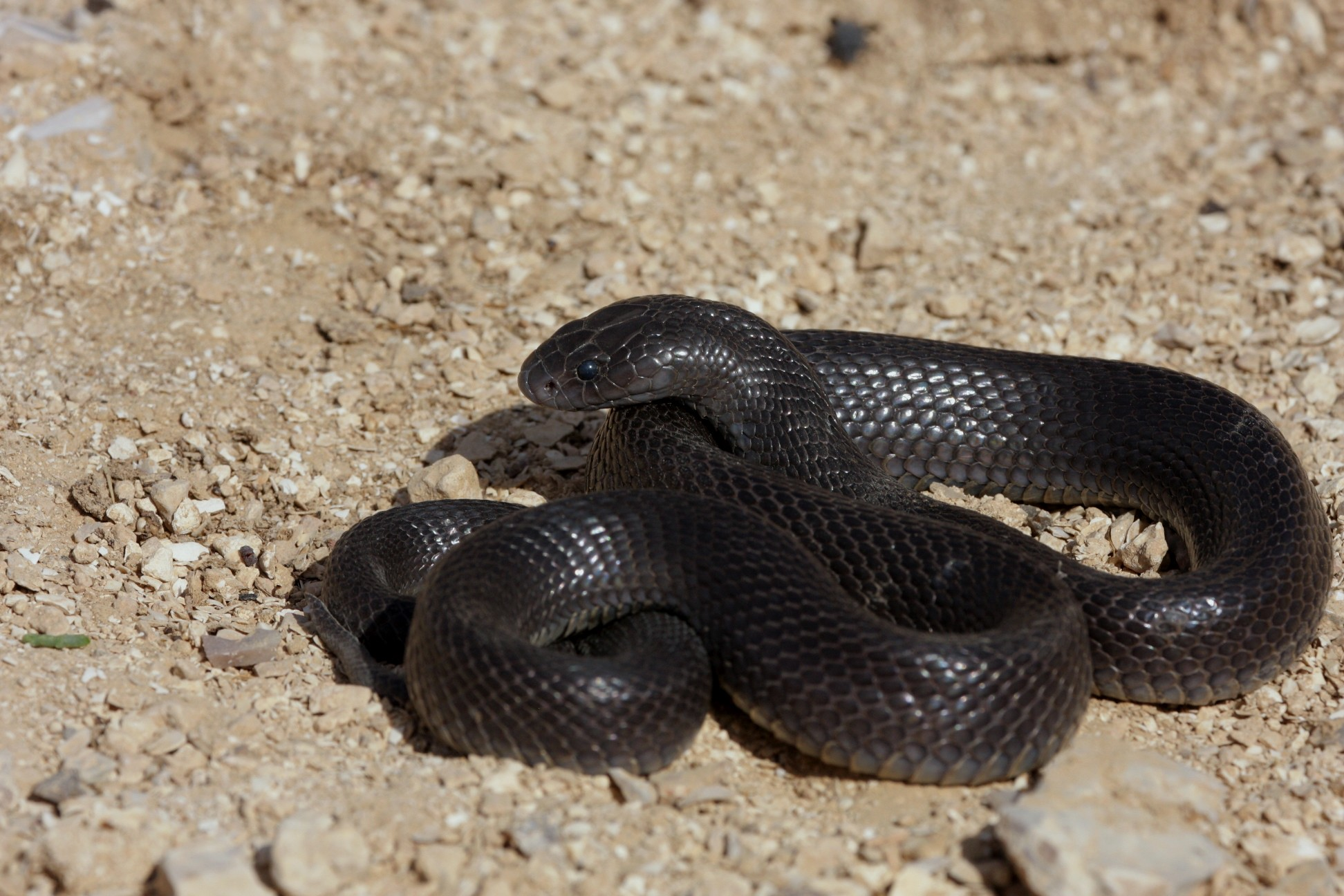
- Walterinnesia aegyptia

Conservation status
- Least Concern (IUCN 3.1)

Scientific classification
- Kingdom: Animalia
- Phylum: Chordata
- Class: Reptilia
- Order: Squamata
- Suborder: Serpentes
- Family: Elapidae
- Genus: Walterinnesia
- Species: W. aegyptia

Binomial name
- Walterinnesia aegyptia Lataste, 1887

= Walterinnesia aegyptia =

Species of snake

Walterinnesia aegyptia, also known as the desert cobra or crow snake, is a species of venomous snakes in the family Elapidae that is native to the Middle East. The specific epithet aegyptia ("of Egypt") refers to part of its geographic range.

== Description and behaviour ==
(See the article on the genus at Walterinnesia)

== Distribution ==
The range of the species encompasses southern Israel, north-western Saudi Arabia, western Jordan, Iraq, Egypt's Sinai Peninsula and possibly Lebanon. The type locality is Cairo, where the type specimen was purchased.

== Venom ==
The desert cobra is highly venomous. The subcutaneous LD_{50} for the venom of W. aegyptia is 0.4 mg/kg. For comparison, the Indian cobra's (Naja naja) subcutaneous LD_{50} is 0.80 mg/kg, while the Cape cobra's (Naja nivea) subcutaneous LD_{50} is 0.72 mg/kg. This makes the desert black snake a more venomous snake (to mice) than both. Venom toxins of the desert cobra are similar to those of the king cobra (Ophiophagus hannah), indicating a close relationship.

Like many elapid snakes, the venom is primarily neurotoxic and the effects of envenenomation are due to systemic circulation of the toxins rather than from local effects on tissue near the site of injection.
