= White Desert National Park =

National park in Egypt

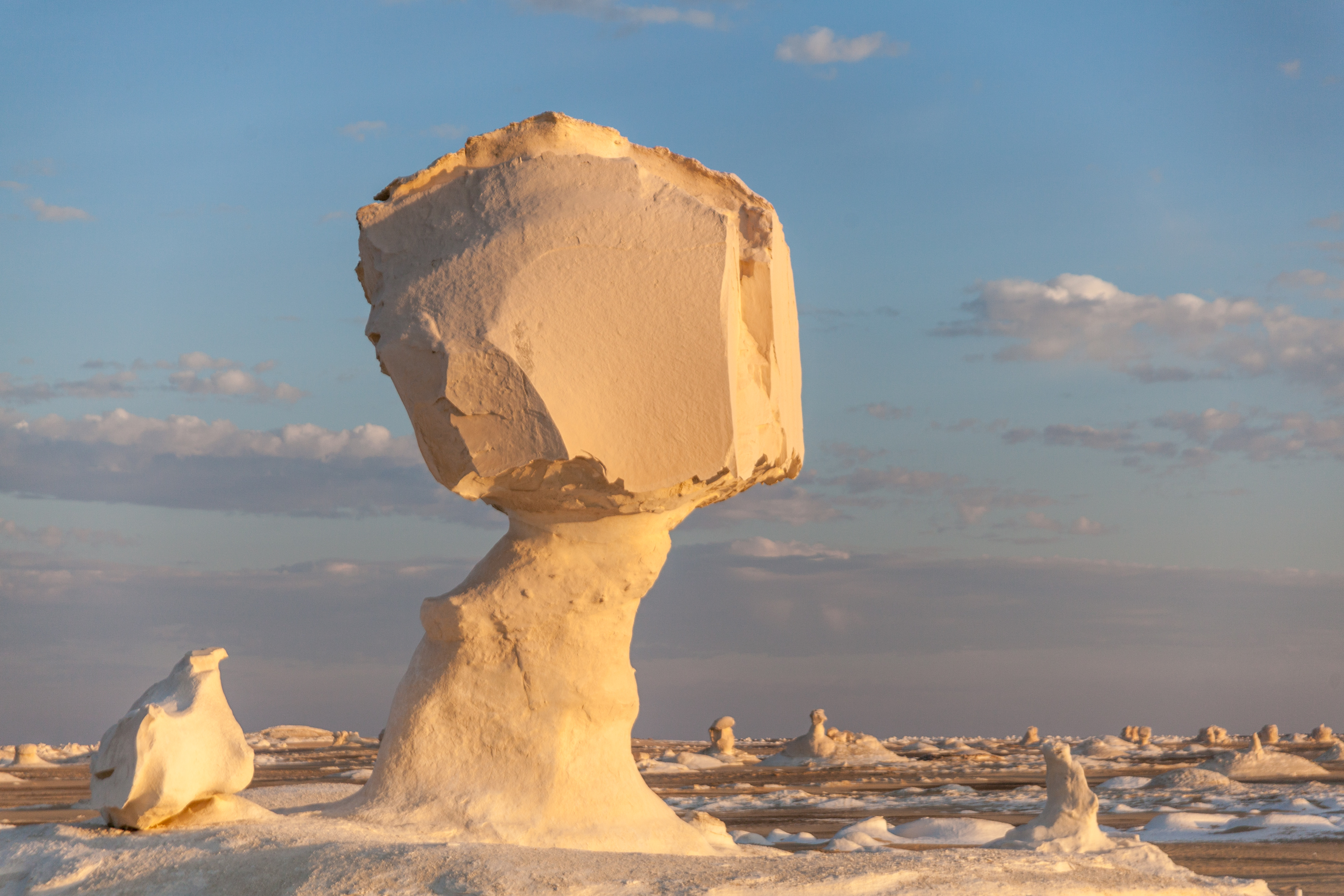
- Rock formations at White Desert National Park

- Location within Egypt
- Location: 570 km (350 mi) southwest of Cairo
- Nearest city: Qasr Al Farafra
- Coordinates: 27°16′38.41″N 28°12′1.59″E
- Area: 300 km^{2} (120 sq mi)
- Established: 2002

Sahara el Beyda, the White Desert Protected Area, is a national park in Egypt, first established as a protected area in 2002. It is located in the Farafra depression, 45 km (28 mi) north of the town of Qasr Al Farafra. Part of the park is in the Farafra Oasis (New Valley Governorate).

The park is the site of large white chalk rock formations, created through erosion by wind and sand, "one of the most important karst massifs in the Western Desert. They are made of white calcium, quartz crystals, or limestone. The park is also the site of cliffs (at the northern end of the Farafra Depression), sand dunes (part of the Great Sand Sea), as well as Wadi Hennis and oases at Ain El Maqfi and Ain El Wadi.

White Desert National Park covers an area of 300 km^{2} (120 mi^{2}). The highest point in the park is at El Qess Abu Said at 353 m (1,158 ft) above sea level, and the lowest is at Wadi Hennis at 32 m (105 ft).

The park serves as the refuge for various animals, including the endangered rhim gazelle and the vulnerable dorcas gazelle, as well as Barbary sheep; jackals; Rüppell's, red and fennec foxes; and the sand cat.

== In popular culture ==
- In the Gathering Storm expansion pack released in 2019 for the turn-based strategy game Civilization VI, the Sahara el Beyda is featured as one of the Natural Wonders.
- Parts of the video for the song “Suraj Hua Maddham” from the Bollywood film “Kabhi Khushi Kabhie Gham” were shot at Sahara el Beyda.
- The White Desert is featured as a playable region in the 2017 action-adventure video game Assassin's Creed: Origins.

== Gallery ==

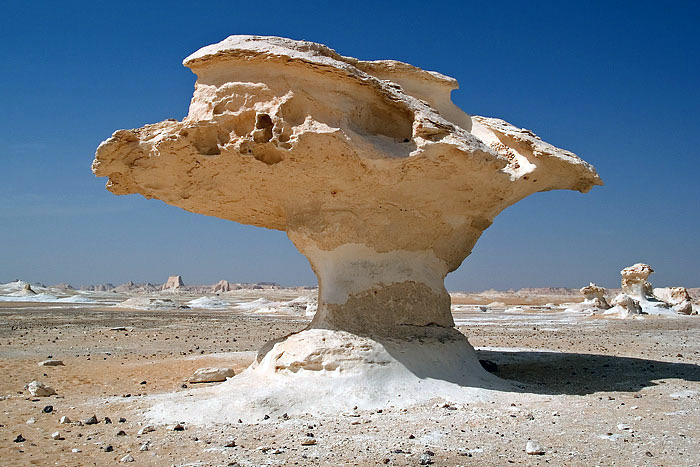

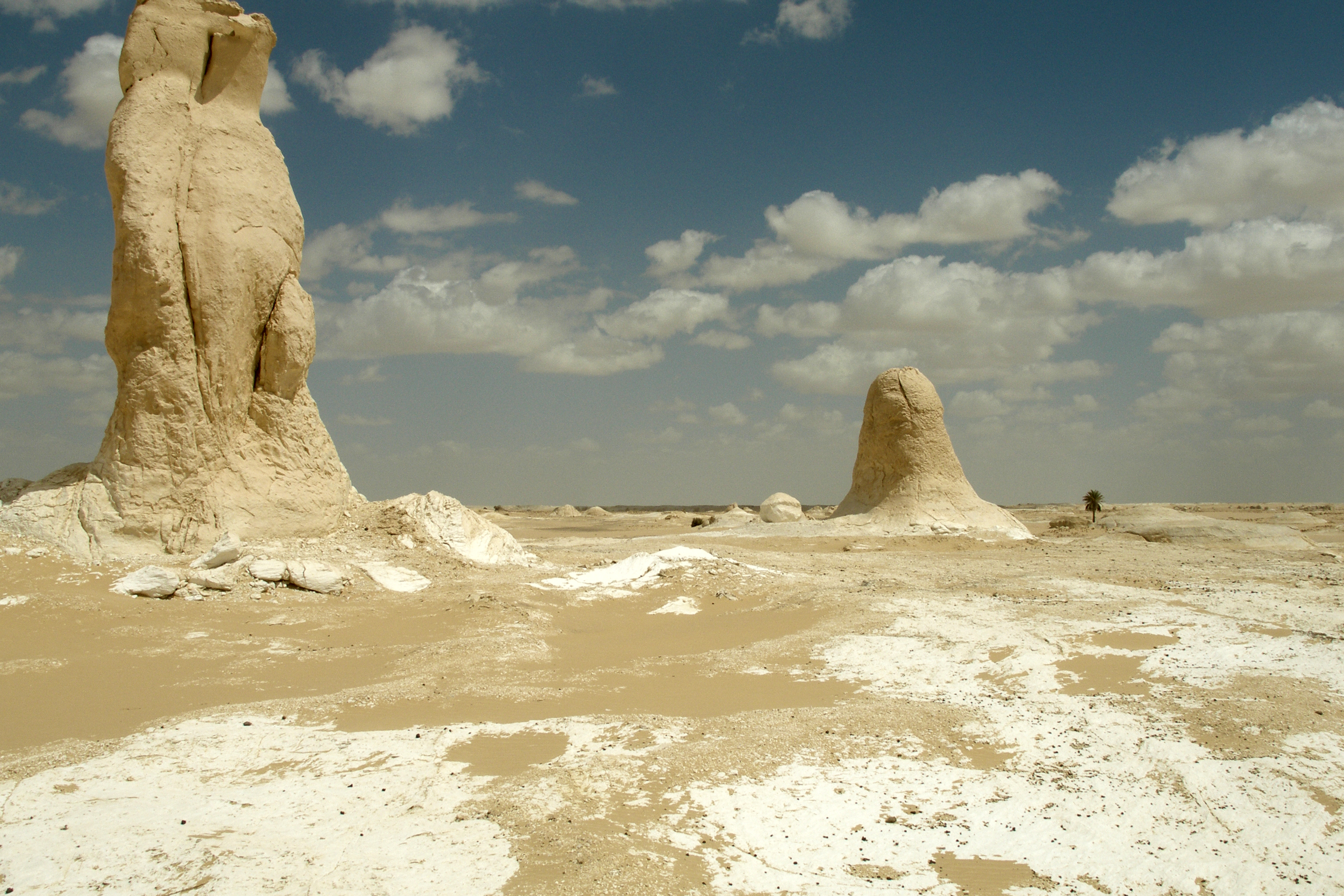

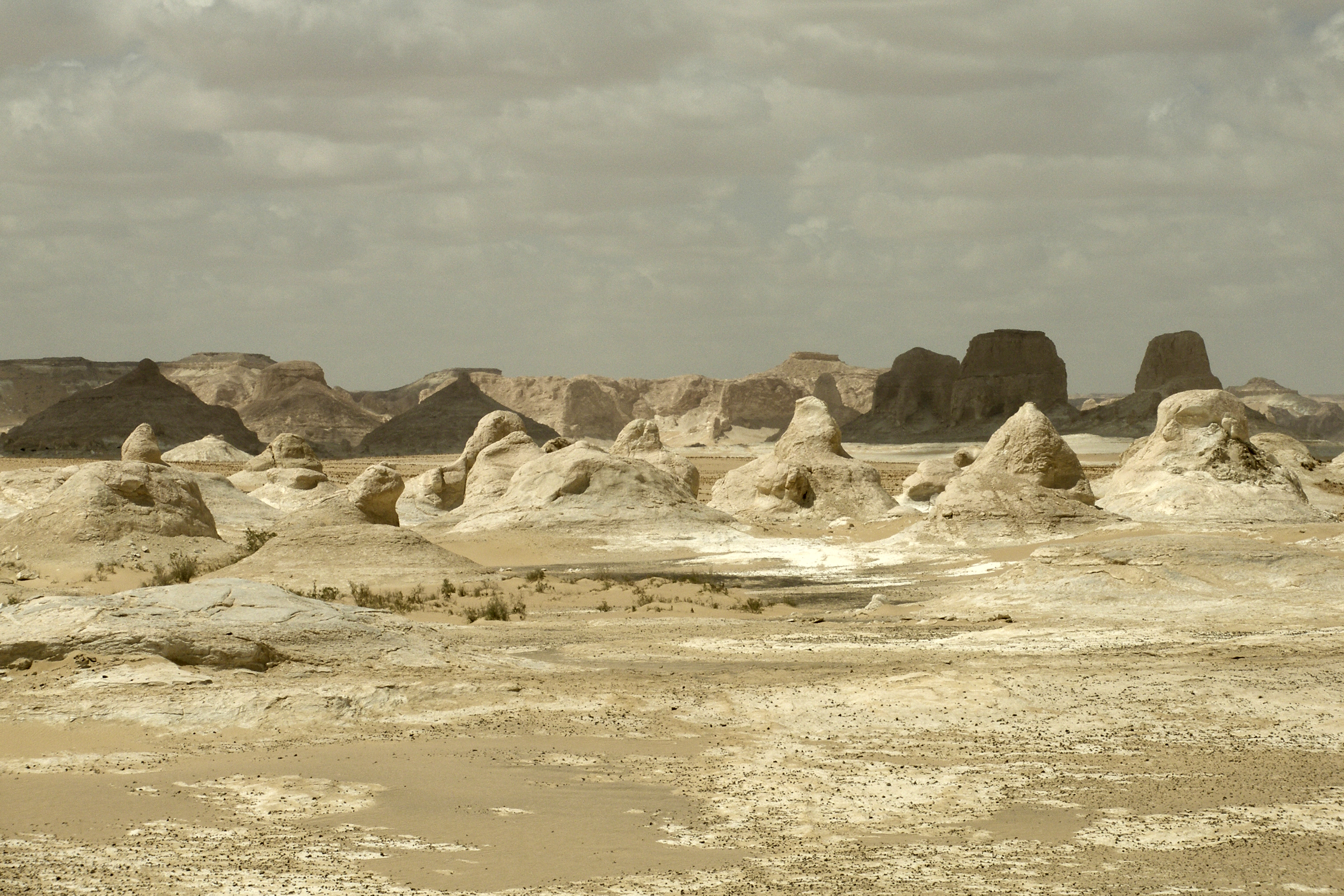

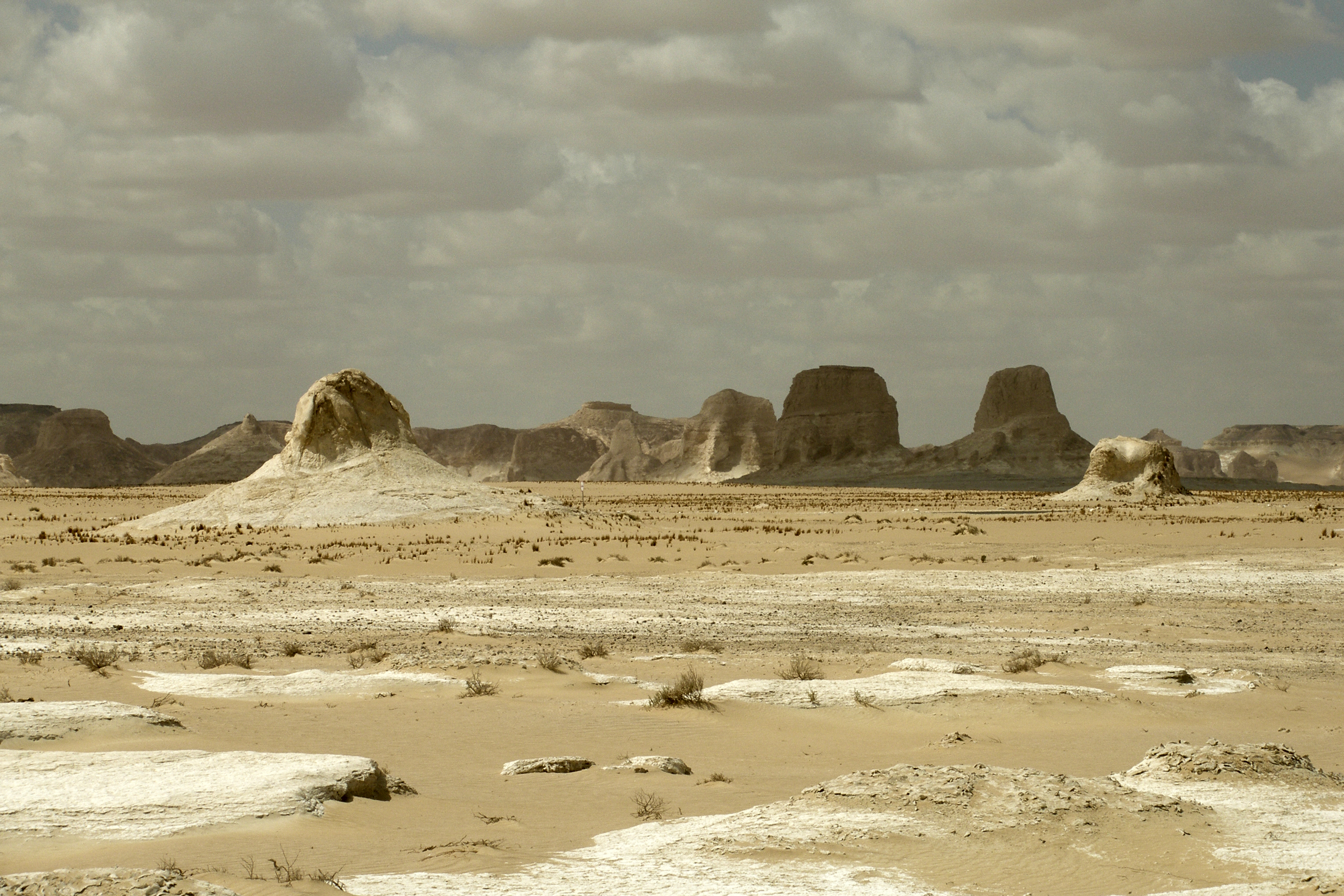

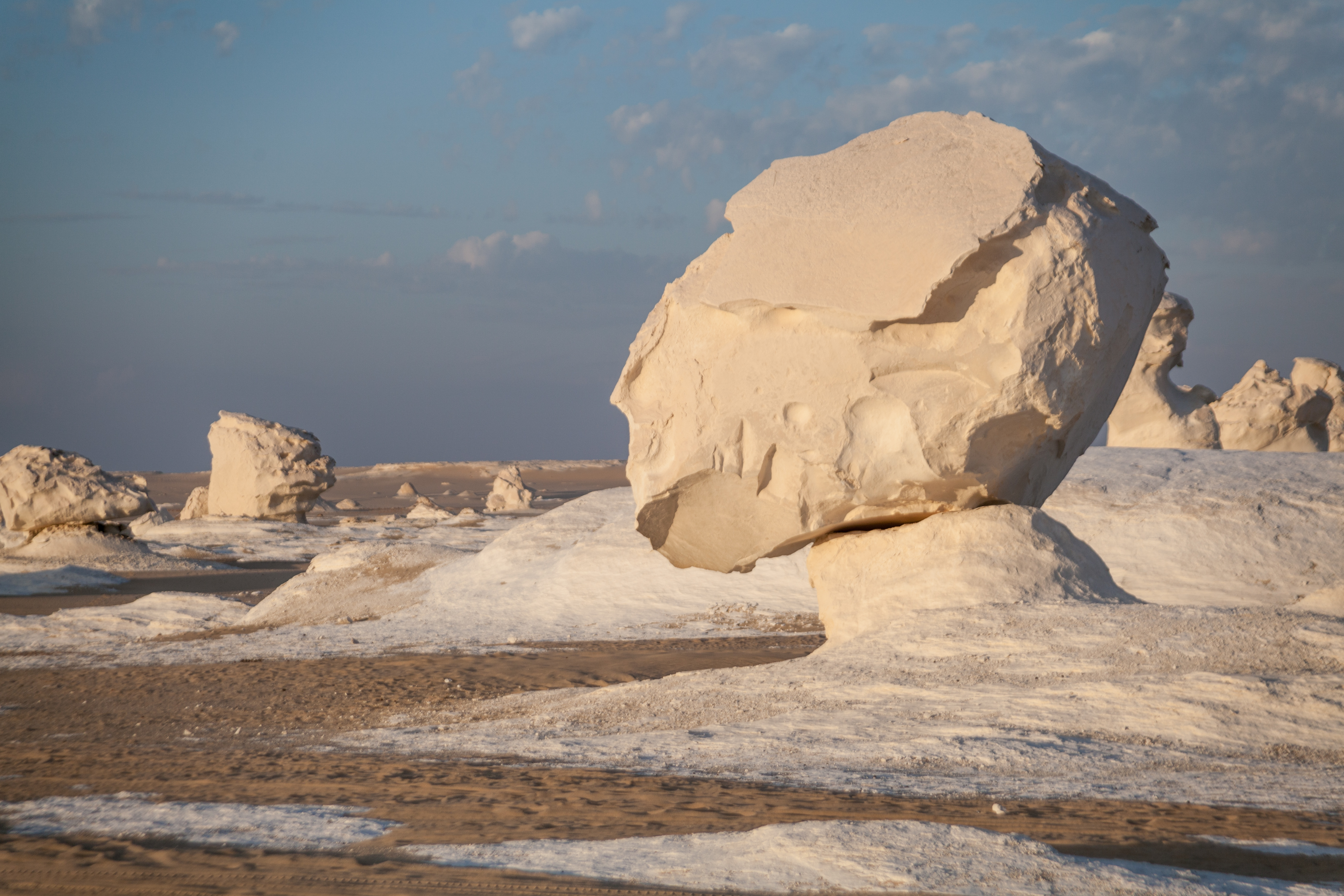
