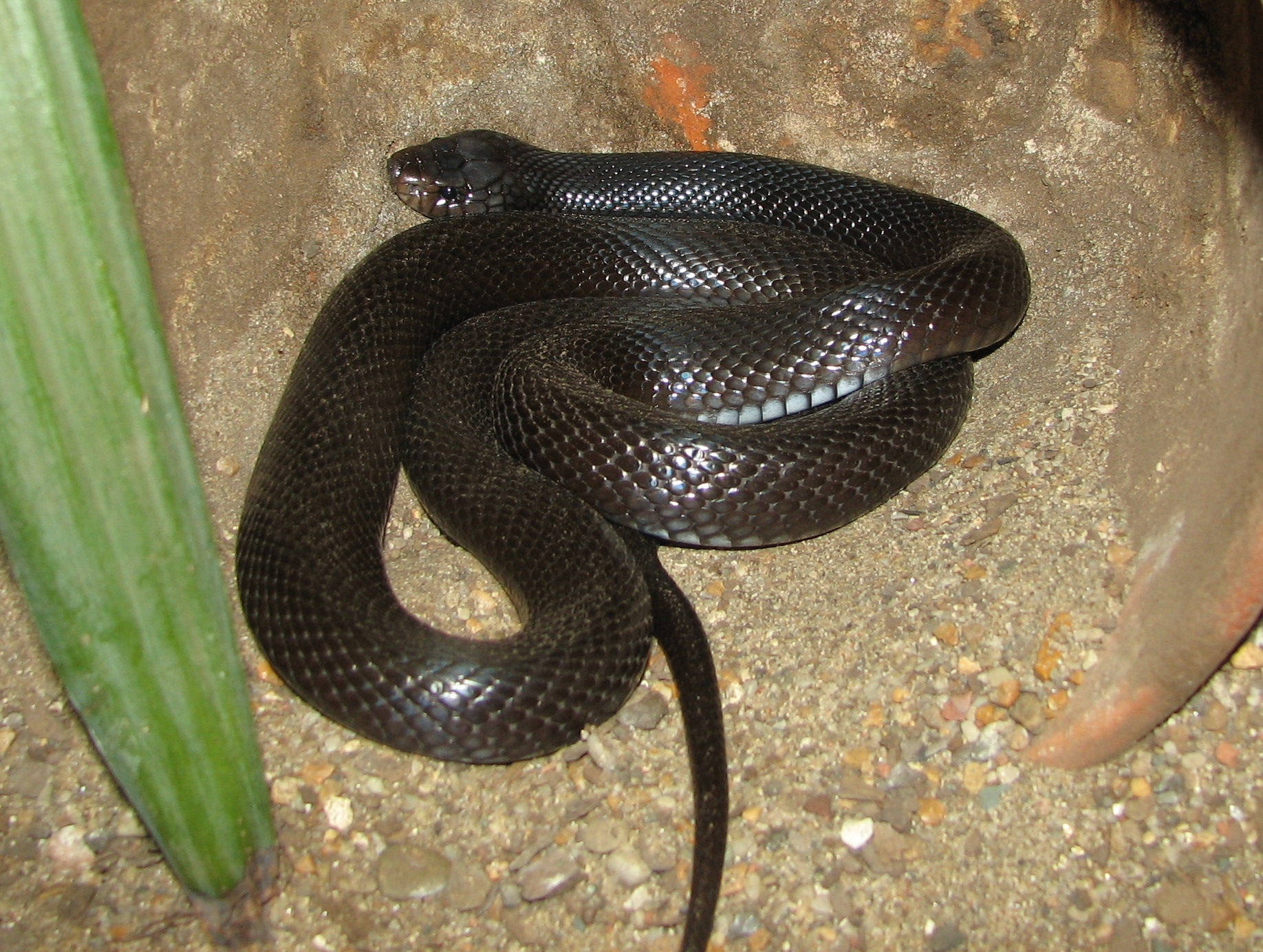
- Walterinnesia aegyptia

Scientific classification
- Kingdom: Animalia
- Phylum: Chordata
- Class: Reptilia
- Order: Squamata
- Suborder: Serpentes
- Family: Elapidae
- Genus: Walterinnesia; Lataste, 1887

Species
- Walterinnesia aegyptia Lataste, 1887; Walterinnesia morgani (Mocquard, 1905)

= Walterinnesia =

Genus of snakes

Walterinnesia is a genus of venomous snakes in the family Elapidae. The genus contains two species, known commonly as desert black snakes or black desert cobras, which are endemic to the Middle East. The generic name Walterinnesia honours Walter Francis Innes Bey (1858–1937), who was a physician and zoologist in Egypt.

== Taxonomy ==
Walterinnesia aegyptia was long considered to be the only species within the genus. However, it was subsequently found that the eastern populations represent a different species, Walterinnesia morgani.

== Description ==
These two species are very similar in appearance and habits. W. aegyptia is entirely black, and has highly shiny scales. W. morgani differs in having a juvenile pattern of reddish crossbars on the back, and lower average ventral and subcaudal scale counts. They have cylindrical bodies and short tails. Their average length is 0.5 meters (1 ft 8 in), but they can grow to 1.8 meters (5 ft 11 in). The head is moderately small, broad, flattened and slightly distinct from the neck. The snout is broad, sharply edged with a distinct canthus rostralis. The eyes are small in size with round pupils. The dorsal scales are smooth anteriorly and weakly keeled on the posterior part of the body and tail. They are very glossy throughout. Dorsal scale count 27 (24 to 29) – 23 (21–25) – 17. Unlike other snakes commonly referred to as "cobras", the black desert cobras rarely rear up or produce a hood before striking in defence.

== Behaviour ==
Desert black snakes are strictly terrestrial and nocturnal, being most active around midnight. They actively pursue and forage for their prey and, rather than envenomate their prey with an open mouth, they usually bite sideways at short distances and often use constriction and suffocation techniques in addition to their venom. There are reports of these snakes being aggressive when molested but, like most snakes, they will usually try to escape rather than immediately bite or face their threat. Venom is not injected immediately when they bite, but released seconds later with chewing movements.

=== Diet ===
These species feed mainly on lizards such as skinks, geckos and agamids, other snakes, toads, and occasionally mice and birds. They will also readily eat carrion.

=== Reproduction ===
The snakes are oviparous.

== Distribution ==
The snakes are native to the Middle East, including the countries of Egypt, Iran, Iraq, Israel, Jordan, Kuwait, Lebanon, Libya, Palestine, Qatar, Saudi Arabia and Turkey.

=== Habitat ===
These species occur in the desert (excluding completely sand deserts such as the ad-Dahna Desert). They can also be found in semi-desert scrubland and rocky terrain, extending into the foothills of vegetated Mediterranean terrain. They are also often found near human habitation in irrigated agricultural settlements.
