= British Portland Cement Research Association =

Coment research organisation in the UK

- Formation: 1918; 108 years ago
- Location: Birmingham, UK

The British Portland Cement Research Association (BPCRA) was a research organisation that worked to advance the technology and techniques related to cement production and handling.

== History ==
The British Portland Cement Research Association (BPCRA) was established in 1918; it was based at Birmingham. A major impedus for its creation was the changing nature of the industry; while Portland cement had originated in the UK, subsiquent developments overseas had led to much of the manufacturing infrastructure being based on foreign developments rather than domestic ones by 1920; accordingly, there was a noted desire to improve domestic innovativeness.

By 1923, the Association had been able to qucikly improve the fuel-based economics of producing cement. During the late 1920s, responsibility for researching the material properties of cement has been allocated to the Building Research Station.

The BPCRA was integrated as the research association of the Cement and Concrete Association. By 1949, it operated a research station in Wexham Springs, Buckinghamshire; this complex comprised several chemistry-centric laboratories that conducted research into both cement and concrete. The station was expanded substantially in the late 1950s and early 1960s; in 1957 alone, three new buildings were opened, containing the printing department, canteen, hostel, lecture theatre, recreation rooms, demonstration hall, as well as additional chemistry and physics laboratories.

The Association was ultimately subsumed into the British Cement Association during the 1980s.

== See also ==
- Portland cement
