= Al Ma'sarah =

City in Dakhla Oasis, Egypt

Al-Ma'sarah المعصرة
- Location in Egypt
- Coordinates: 25°30′07″N 29°06′59″E
- Country: Egypt

Al-Ma'sarah, also spelled Maasarah or Masarah (Arabic: المعصرة), is a city in Dakhla Oasis, Egypt.

== Overview ==
With a population of about 5,000 inhabitants, Al-Ma'sarah is a village in Dakhla Oasis. The town lies on the western desert of Egypt.
