= Pig melon =

Pig melon is a common name for two species of plants in the melon family which are invasive in Australia:

- Citrullus lanatus, a weedy form of the cultivated watermelon
- Citrullus colocynthis
