= Grzegorz Majcherek =

Polish archaeologist and academic

- Education: University of Warsaw
- Scientific career
- Fields: Archaeology
- Workplaces: Polish Centre of Mediterranean Archaeology of the University of Warsaw
- Website: pcma.uw.edu.pl/en/about-us/staff/grzegorz-majcherek/

Grzegorz Majcherek is a Polish archaeologist and professor at the University of Warsaw.

Researcher specializing in classical archaeology, primarily focusing on Egypt and the Middle East during the Roman period. Ancient ceramics expert, he studies amphorae from the Roman and Byzantine periods, issues related to their production and distribution, and the resulting trade connections in the Mediterranean region. His research interests also include the urban architecture of ancient Egyptian and Middle Eastern cultural centers and studies on its transformations at the end of antiquity.

Professor Majcherek directs the flagship research projects of the Polish Centre of Mediterranean Archaeology of the University of Warsaw in Egypt and the Middle East: since 2002, the Polish-Egyptian Archaeological and Conservation Expedition to Kom el-Dikka in Alexandria (since 1988 as filed director), and since 2010, the Polish-Syrian Archaeological Expedition to Palmyra in Syria, succeeding Professor Michał Gawlikowski.

During the excavations he led in Alexandria, a complex of auditoria from the 6th century was investigated, comprising 22 rooms located along a monumental portico and a theater (odeon) converted into an auditorium. Prof. Majcherek was the first to identify this structure as an academic complex, which has been named “the oldest university in the world”. This is one of the most important discoveries in Polish Mediterranean archaeology.

In 2009, he was awarded the Knight's Cross of the Order of Polonia Restituta by the President of Poland for his outstanding scientific achievements and contribution to the development of Polish-Egyptian scientific cooperation.

== Professional career ==
Since 1992, he has pursued his academic career at the Polish Centre of Mediterranean Archaeology of the University of Warsaw, as an assistant, assistant professor, and then professor. For over 10 years, he served as deputy director of this institution. In 2024, he was appointed as a professor at the University of Warsaw.

== Publications ==
- Author of over 80 scientific publications (monographs, chapters, articles in scientific journals), devoted primarily to ancient Alexandria, Palmyra, and Roman and Byzantine amphorae;
- Since 2010, editor-in-chief of the journal and publication series Studia Palmyreńskie;
- Since 2018, consultant editor (ceramology) for Polish Archaeology in the Mediterranean;
- Member of the editorial board of the Warsaw Studies in Archaeology (WSA) series, published by Brepols Publishers.
