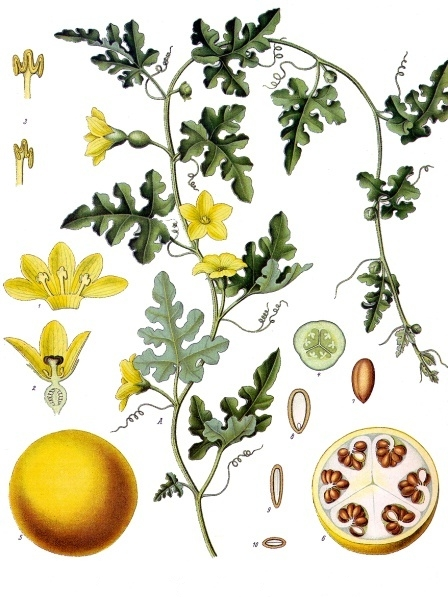
- Citrullus colocynthis from Koehler's Medicinal-Plants (1887).

Scientific classification
- Kingdom: Plantae
- Clade: Tracheophytes
- Clade: Angiosperms
- Clade: Eudicots
- Clade: Rosids
- Order: Cucurbitales
- Family: Cucurbitaceae
- Genus: Citrullus
- Species: C. colocynthis

Binomial name
- Citrullus colocynthis (L.) Schrad.

Synonyms
- Citrullus colocynthoides Pangalo; Citrullus pseudocolocynthis M.Roem.; Colocynthis officinalis Schrad.; Colocynthis vulgaris Schrad.; Cucumis bipinnatifidus Wight ex Naudin; Cucumis colocynthoides Schult.; Cucurbita colocyntha Link

= Citrullus colocynthis =

Species of vine

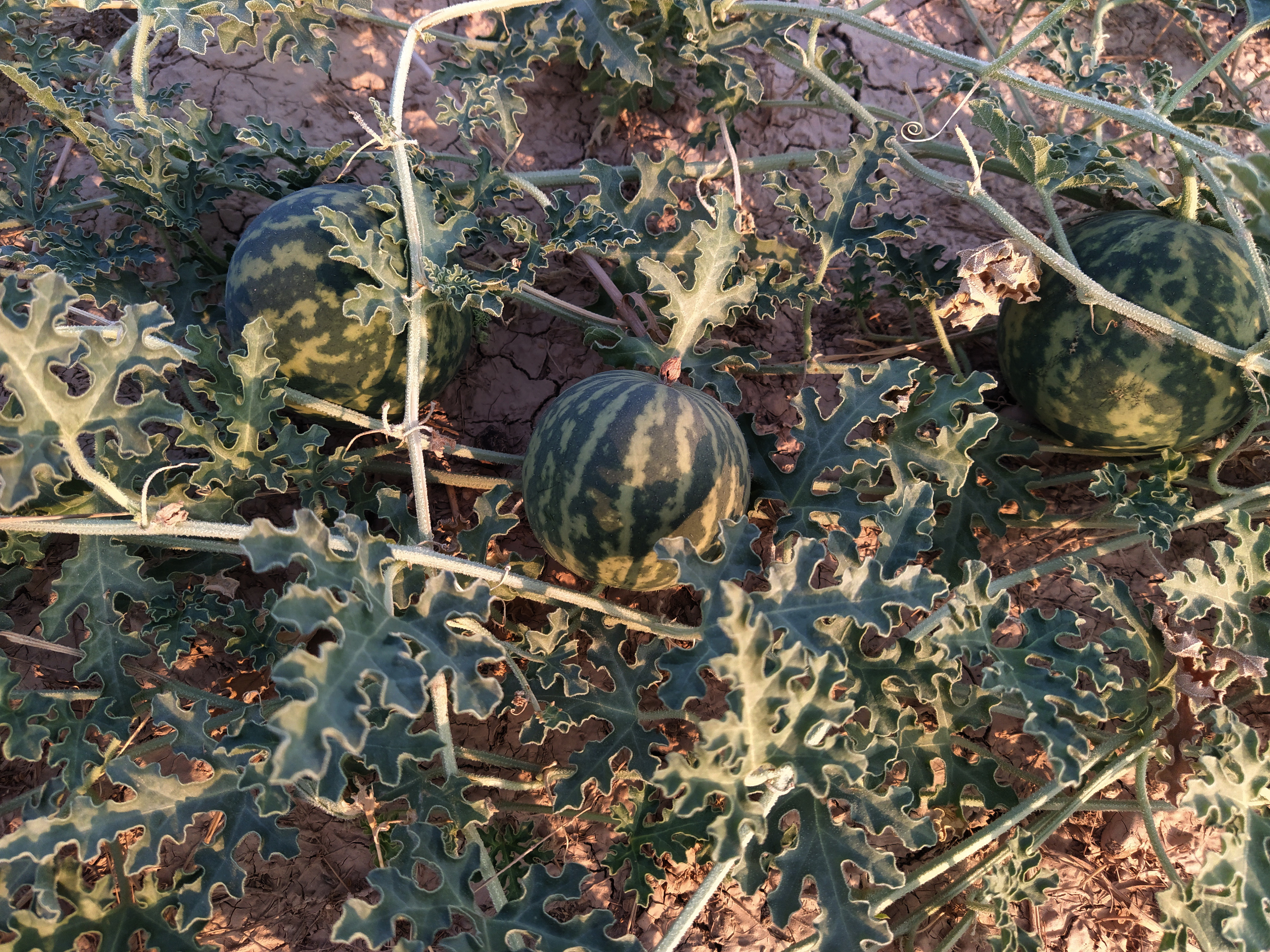
Citrullus Colocynthis Fruit in Behbahan

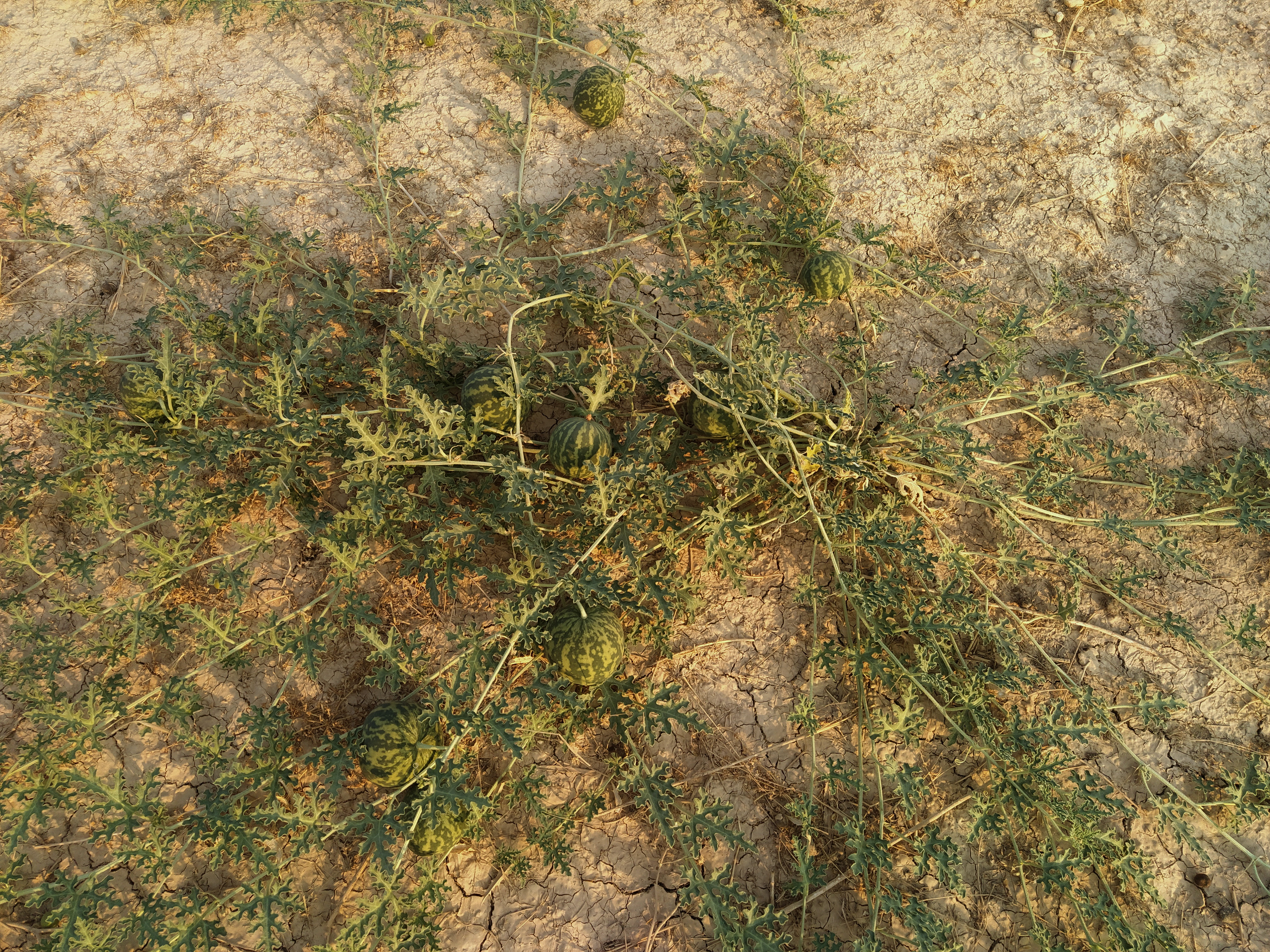
Wild Citrullus Colocynthis

Citrullus colocynthis, with many common names including colocynth, coloquintida, bitter apple, bitter cucumber, vine of Sodom, or wild gourd, is a poisonous desert viny plant native to the Mediterranean Basin and West Asia, especially the Levant, Turkey (especially in regions such as İzmir), and Nubia.

It resembles a common watermelon vine but bears small, hard fruits with a bitter pulp. The plant contains cytotoxic cucurbitacins and is thus unsafe to use as an herbal medicine. It originally bore the scientific name Colocynthis citrullus.

== Description ==
The vine ranges from 2.4–3 metres (8–10 feet) in length.

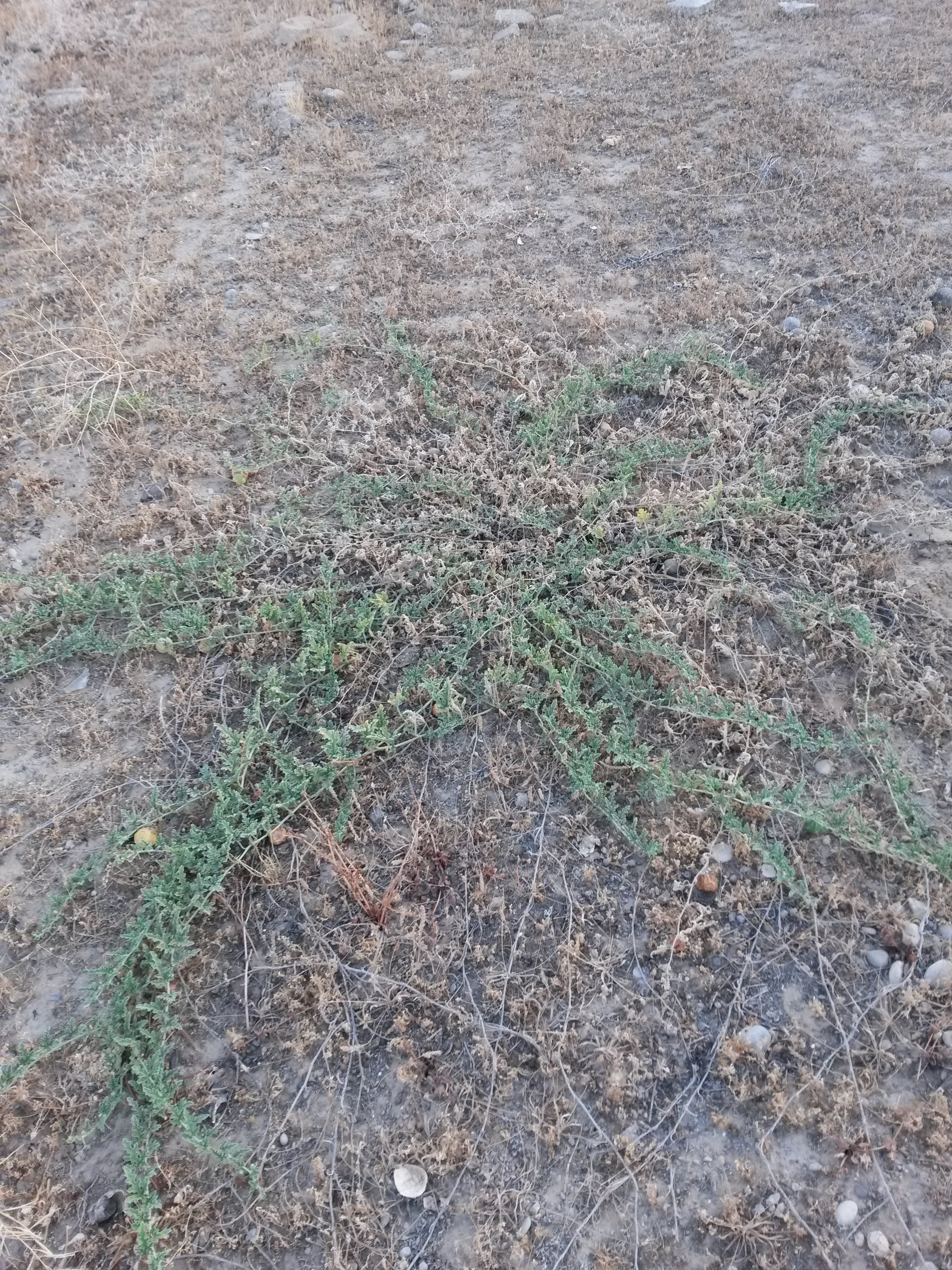
Specimen in Ab Pakhsh

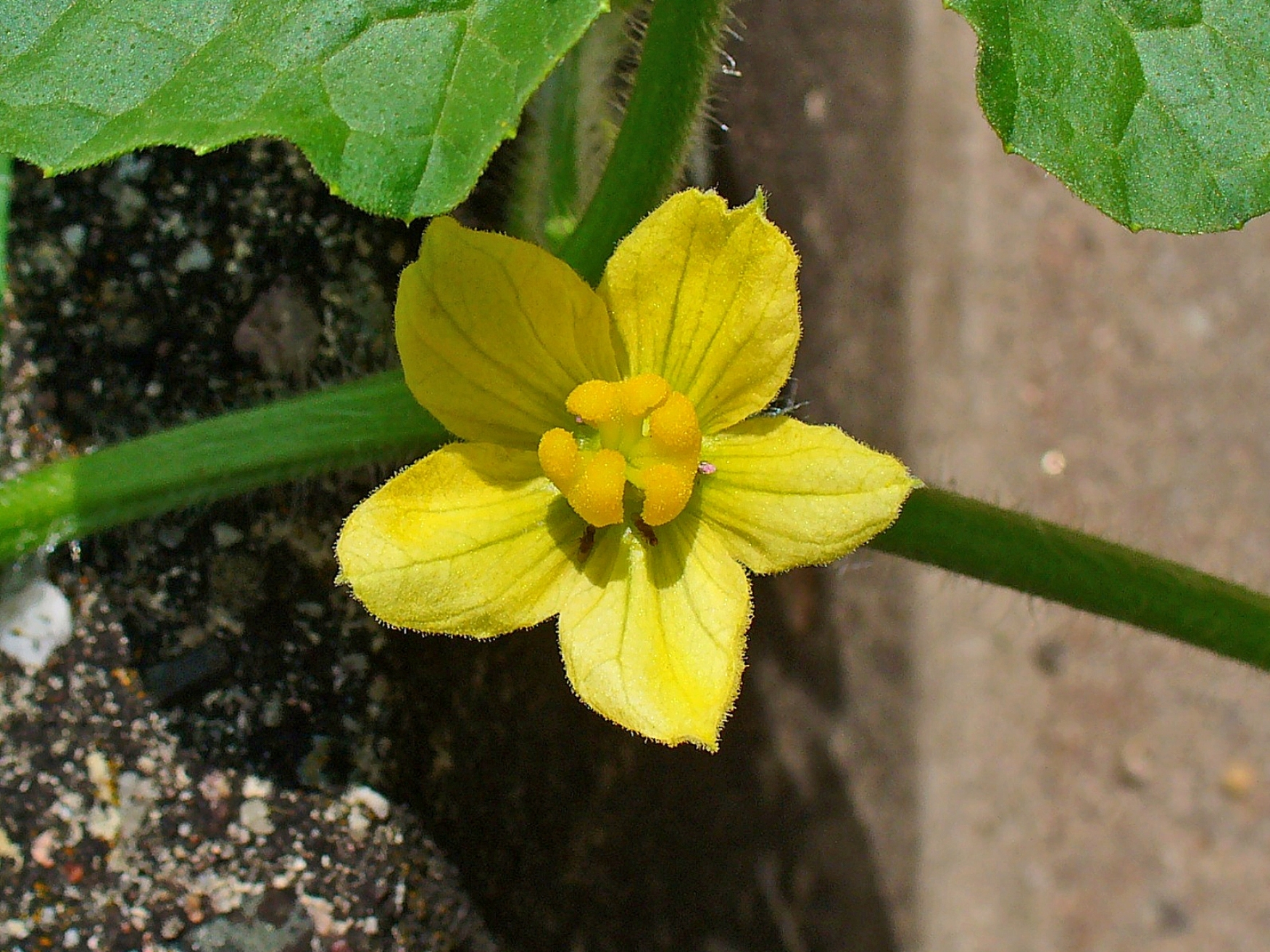
A female flower

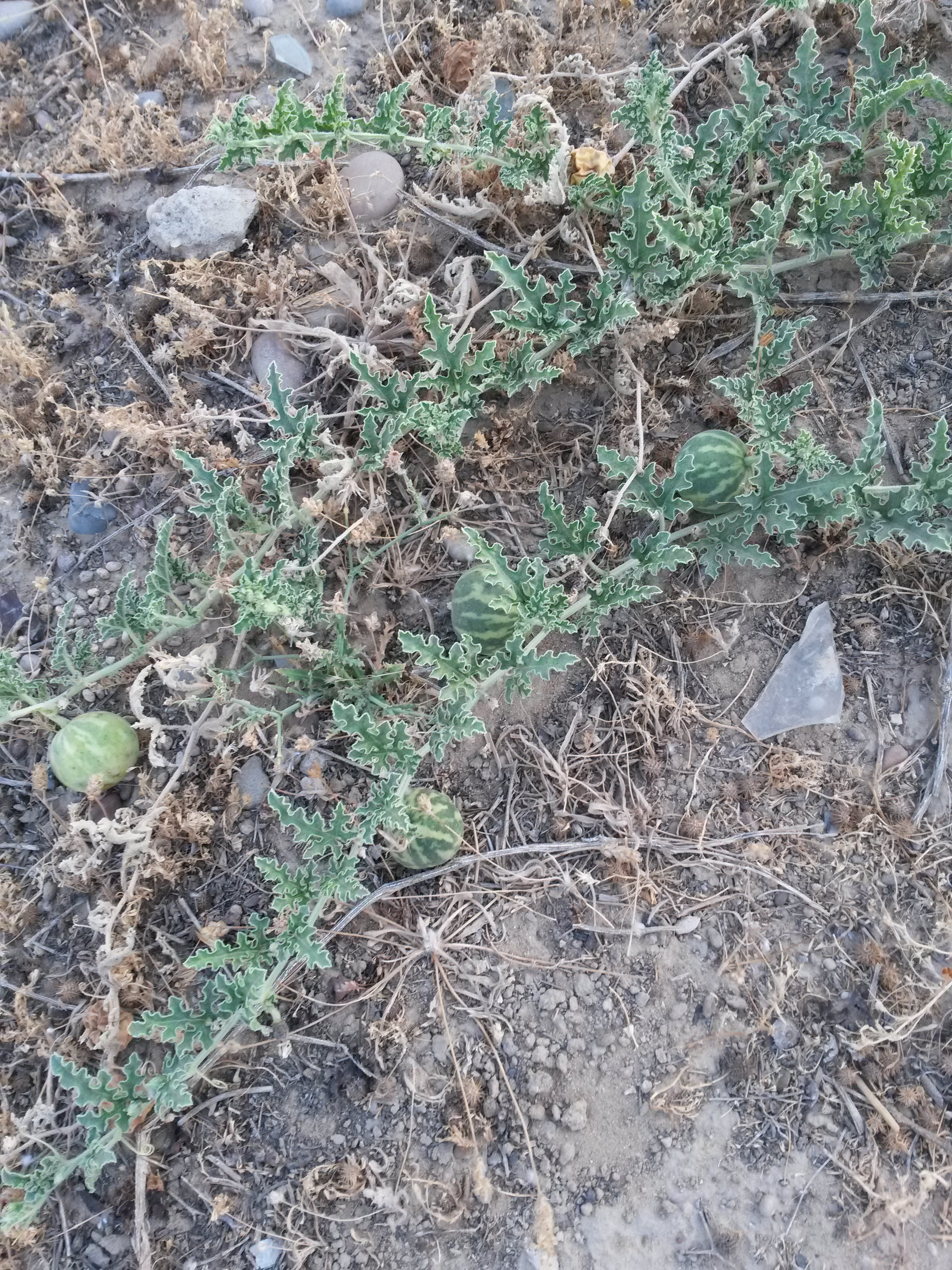
Fruits in Ab Pakhsh

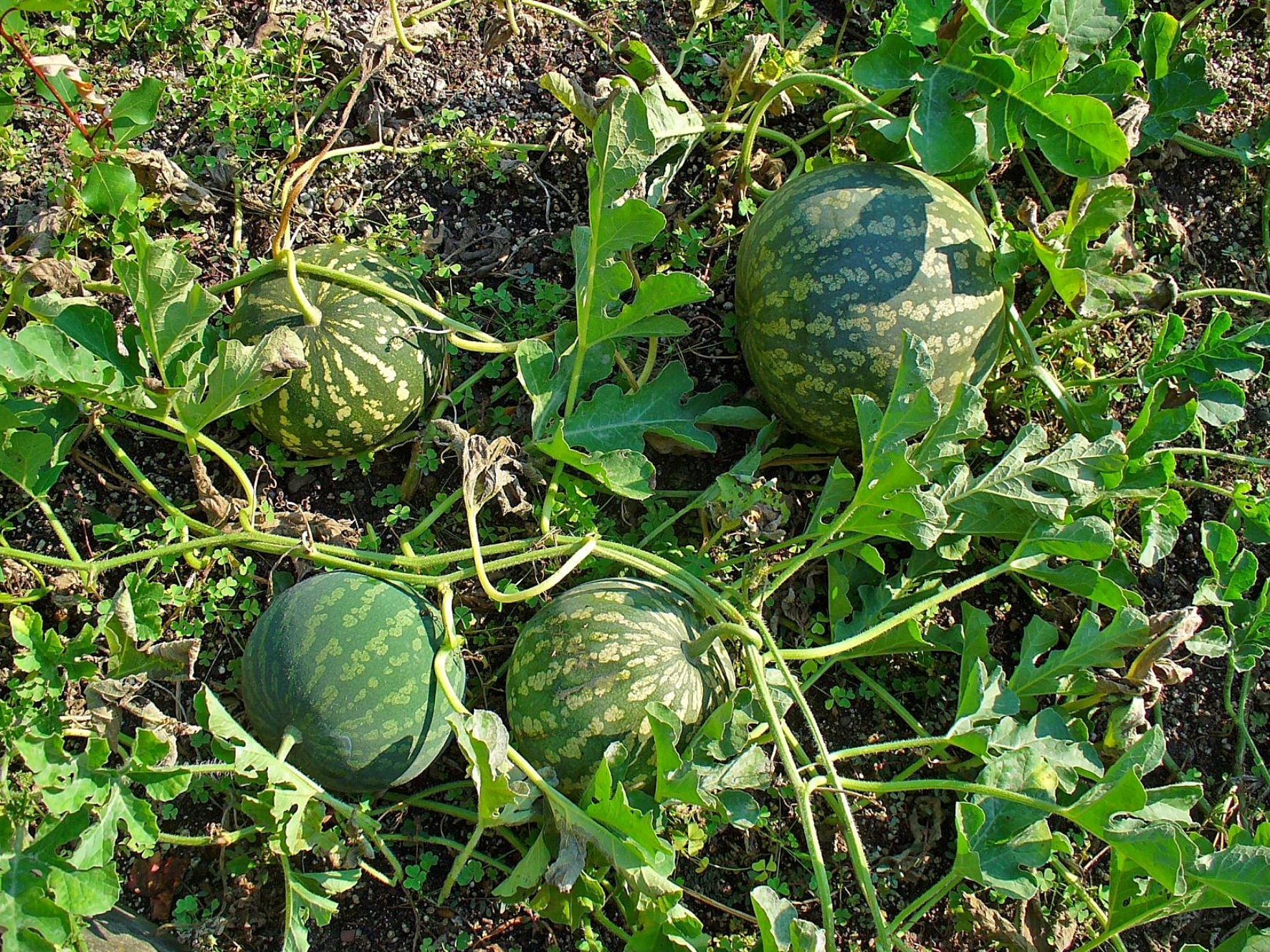
Ripe fruit

=== Roots and stems ===
The roots are large, fleshy, and perennial, leading to a high survival rate due to the long tap root. The vine-like stems spread in all directions for a few meters looking for something over which to climb. If present, shrubs and herbs are preferred and climbed by means of auxiliary branching tendrils.

=== Leaves ===
Very similar to watermelon, the leaves are palmate and angular with three to seven divided lobes.

=== Flowers ===
The flowers are yellow and solitary in the axes of leaves and are borne by yellow-greenish peduncles. Each has a subcampanulated five-lobed corolla and a five-parted calyx. They are monoecious, so the male (stamens) and the female reproductive parts (pistils and ovary) are borne in different flowers on the same plant. The male flowers' calyx is shorter than the corolla. They have five stamens, four of which are coupled and one is single with monadelphous anther. The female flowers have three staminoids and a three-carpel ovary. The two sexes are distinguishable by observing the globular and hairy inferior ovary of the female flowers.

=== Fruits ===
The fruit is smooth, spheric with a diameter of 5 to 10 centimetres (2 to 4 inches) and an extremely bitter taste. The calyx englobe the yellow-green fruit which becomes marble (yellow stripes) at maturity. The mesocarp is filled with a soft, dry, and spongy white pulp, in which the seeds are embedded. Each of the three carpels bears six seeds. Each plant produces 15 to 30 fruits.

=== Seeds ===
The seeds are gray and 5 millimetres (1/4 in) long by 3 mm (1/8 in) wide. They are similarly bitter, nutty-flavored, and rich in fat and protein. They are eaten whole or used as an oilseed. The oil content of the seeds is 17–19% (w/w), consisting of 67–73% linoleic acid, 10–16% oleic acid, 5–8% stearic acid, and 9–12% palmitic acid. The oil yield is about 400 L/hectare. In addition, the seeds contain a high amount of arginine, tryptophan, and the sulfur-containing amino acids.

=== Similar species ===
It resembles the watermelon, which is in the same genus.

== Distribution and habitat ==
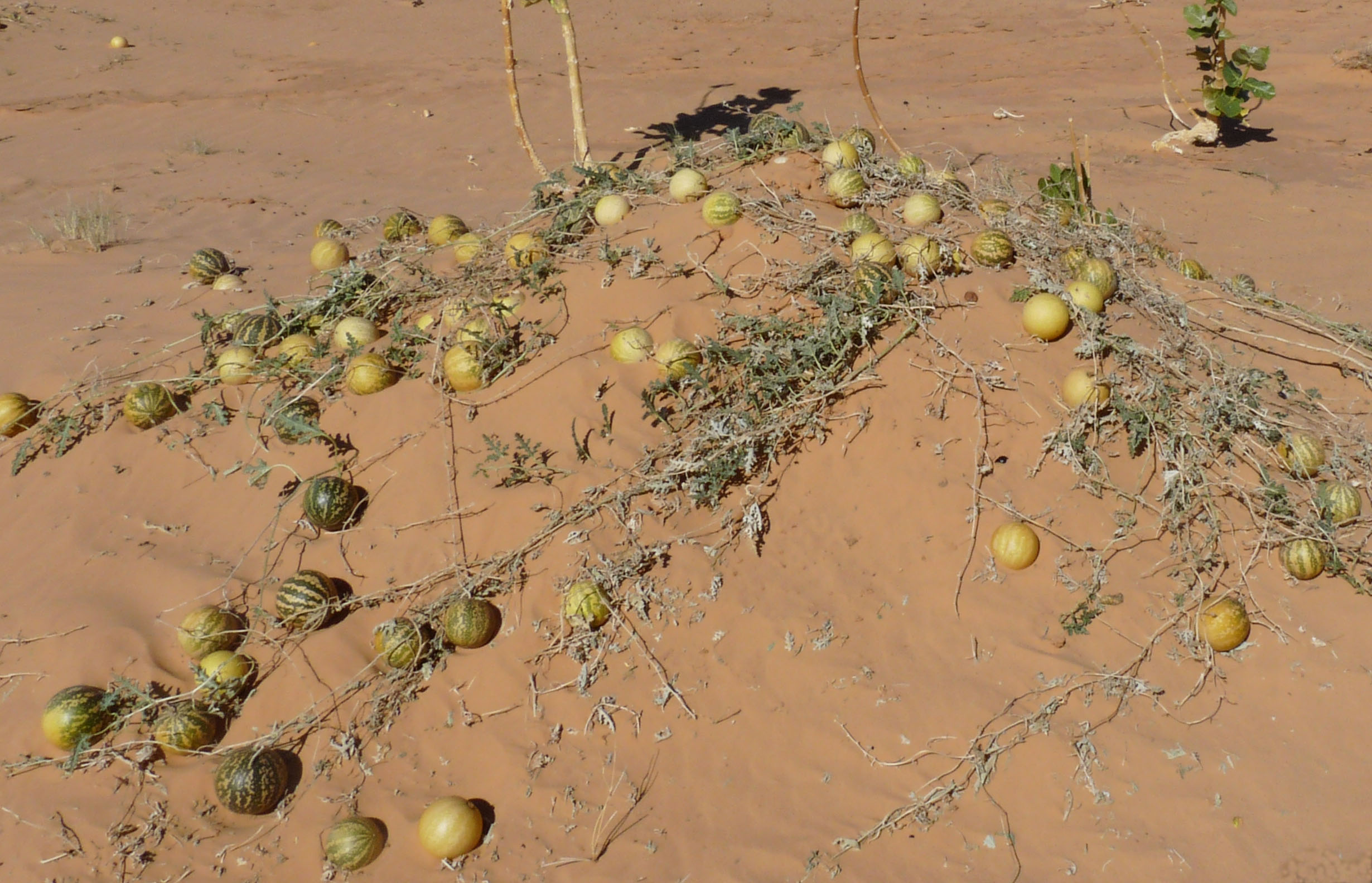
Colocynths in Adrar Desert (Mauritania)

Citrullus colocynthis is a desert viney plant that grows in sandy, arid soils. It is native to the Mediterranean Basin and Asia, and is distributed among the west coast of northern Africa, eastward through the Sahara, Egypt until India, and reaches also the north coast of the Mediterranean and the Caspian Seas. It grows also in Southern Europe and on the Aegean Islands. On the island of Cyprus, it is cultivated on a small scale; it has been an income source since the 14th century and is still exported today.

It is an annual or a perennial plant in the wild in Indian arid zones, and survives under extreme xeric conditions. In fact, it can tolerate annual precipitation of 250 to 1,500 mm (10 to 59 in) and an annual temperature of 14.8 to 27.8 °C. It grows from sea level up to 1,500 m (4,900 ft) above sea level on sandy loam, subdesert soils, and sandy sea coasts with a pH range between 5.0 and 7.8.

Historical accounts of trade go back to 1895 tracing its harvest and trade in Palestine's Jaffa for export to England under the commerce name of Turkish colocynth. "Brief account of the growth of colocynth in Palestine has more recently appeared in the United States consular reports (1895) from which we abstract the following points of interest : 19 The fruit grows abundantly between the mountains of Palestine and the eastern shore of the Mediterranean, from the city of Gaza northward to Mount Carmel. The plant thrives without any attention whatever on the part of the husbandman, since the climate and soil are all-sufficient for its perfect growth-the natural requirements being merely a sandy soil, warm climate and little moisture. The fruit which is known in commerce as the Turkish colocynth is collected by the native peasants (fellaheens) in July and August, before it is quite ripe, and is sold to Jaffa dealers, who peel it and dry the pulp in the sun, It is then molded into irregular small balls, packed in boxes and exported, mostly via England."

== Cultivation ==
C. colocynthis, a perennial plant, can propagate both by generative and vegetative means. However, seed germination is poor due to the extreme xeric conditions, so vegetative propagation is more common and successful in nature. In the Indian arid zone, growth takes place between January and October, but the most favorable period for the vegetative growth is during summer, which coincides with the rainy season. Growth declines as soon as the rains and the temperature decrease and almost stops during the cold and dry months of December and January. Colocynth prefers sandy soils and is an example of water management that may be useful in research on how desert plants react to water stress. To enhance production, an organic fertilizer can be applied. Colocynth is also commonly cultivated together with cassava (intercropping) in Nigeria.

Cultivated colocynth suffers of climatic stress and diseases such as cucumber mosaic virus, melon mosaic virus, Fusarium wilt, etc. as any other crop. To improve it, a relatively new protocol for regeneration has been developed with the aim of incorporating disease and stress resistance to increase yield potential and security avoiding interspecific hybridization barriers.

== Uses ==
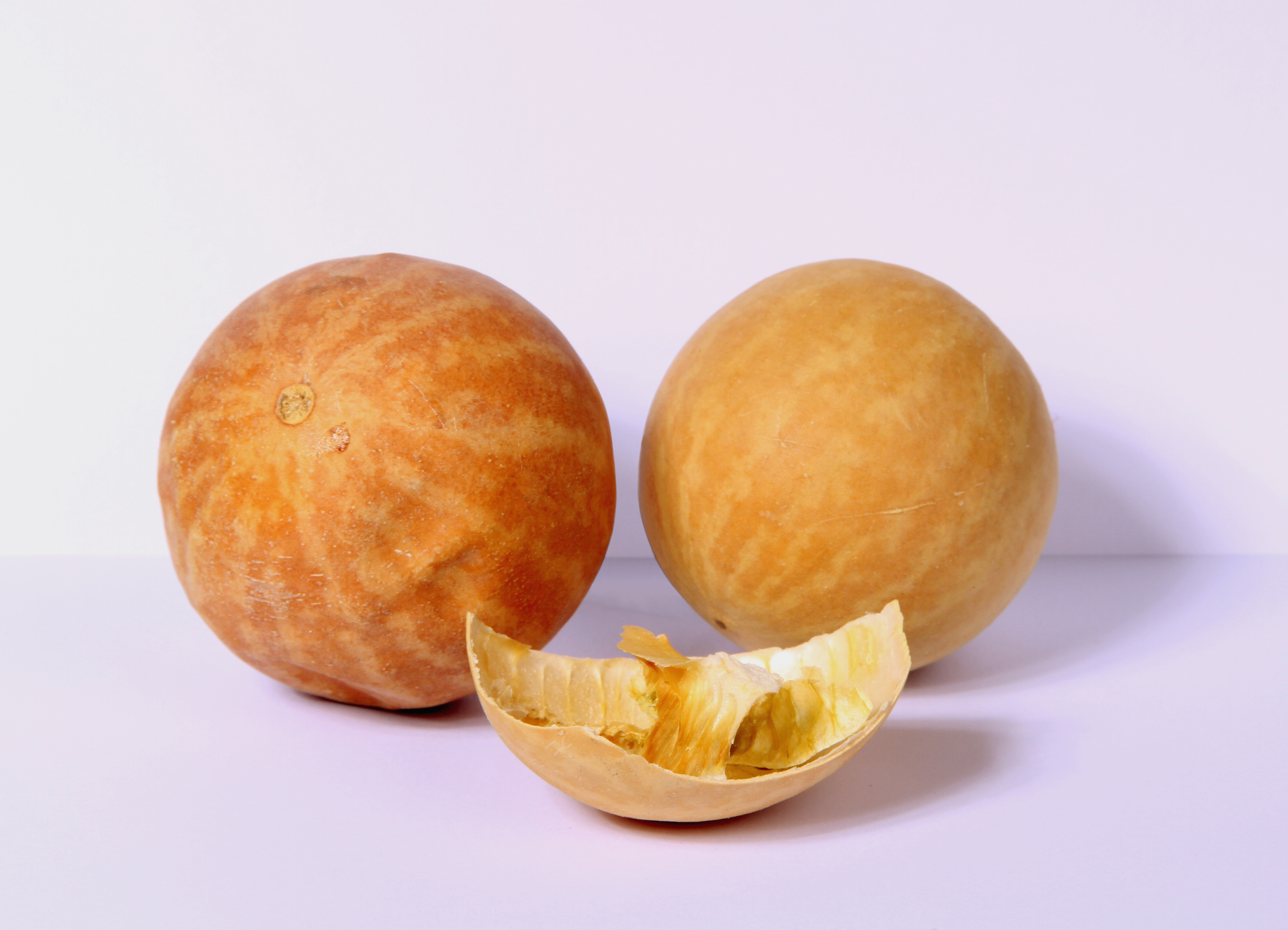
Iranian fruit

C. colocynthis can be eaten or processed as energy source, e.g. oilseed and biofuel. The characteristic small seed of the colocynth have been found in several early archeological sites in northern Africa and the Near East, specifically at Neolithic Armant, Nagada in Egypt; at sites dating from 3800 BC to Roman times in Libya; and the pre-pottery Neolithic levels of the Nahal Hemar caves in Palestine. Zohary and Hopf speculate, "these finds indicate that the wild colocynth was very probably used by humans prior to its domestication."

=== Traditional medicine ===
Colocynth has been widely used in traditional medicine for centuries. The powder of colocynth was sometimes used externally with aloes, unguents, or bandages. Lozenges or pastilles made of colocynth were called "troches of alhandal" or trochisci alhandalæ and used as a laxative. They were usually composed of colocynth, bdellium, and gum tragacanth. Alhandal is derived from Arabic: الْحَنْظَل, romanized: al-Ḥanẓal, a name for colocynth.

In traditional Arab veterinary medicine, colocynth sap was used to treat skin eruptions in camels. In Palestine it has been used to treat constipation, scabies, and postpartum inflammation in sheep, cows, goats, and chicken.

=== Culinary ===
The seeds of colocynth, which must be separated from the fruits and thoroughly cooked to make them edible, have been used since antiquity as a food source in areas of the Sahara and Sahel where crops frequently fail or regular farming is impossible. The enigmatic early Egyptian ceramic Clayton rings found in the Western Desert may have been portable ovens for roasting colocynth seeds. The desert Bedouin are said to make a type of bread from the ground seeds. The closely related watermelon (Citrullus lanatus (Thunb)) was domesticated in Ancient Egypt, and may have been developed for edible seed from cultivated colocynth.

In West Africa, the seeds of the colocynth (called egusi) are used as the basis for making egusi soup.

The flowers can be eaten, and the stem tips are a source of water.

=== Other uses and research ===
The oil obtained from the seeds (47%) can be used for soap production. The production is not time- and energy-consuming due to the ability of colocynth to grow on poor soils with just a little moisture and organic fertilizer. The fruits are harvested still unripe by hand, the rind is removed by peeling and the inner pulp filled with seeds is dried in the sun or in ovens. The seeds yield is about 6.7 to 10 tonnes per 1 ha (2.5 acres), which means that for an oil profit of 31 to 47%, oil yields may reach up to 3 tonnes per ha.

Oleic and linoleic acids isolated from C. colocynthis petroleum ether extracts show larvicidal activity against mosquitoes.

== See also ==
- Handala, a cartoon character and Palestinian national symbol named after the colocynth (Arabic: حنظل, ḥanẓal)
- Vine of Sodom
