= Trimithis =

Ancient city in the Western Desert, Egypt

- Τριμιθις (Ancient Greek)
- Amheida
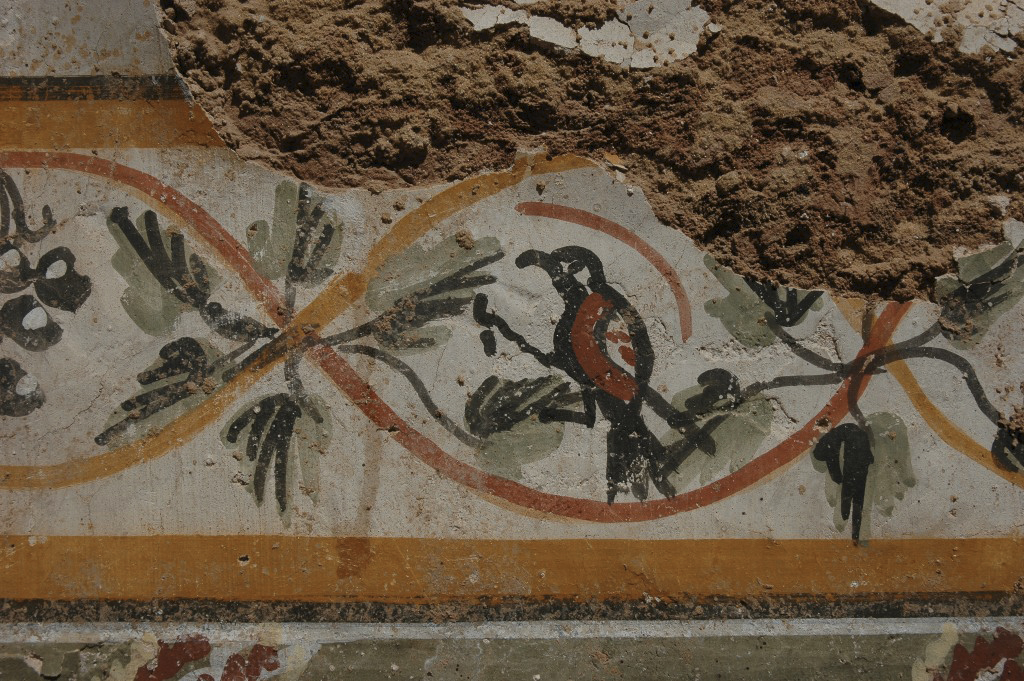
- Wall decoration from Trimithis
- Interactive map of Trimithis
- 25°40′4″N 28°52′17″E
- Type: Ancient city
- Periods: Old Kingdom, New Kingdom, Roman period, Late Antiquity
- Cultures: Ancient Egyptian, Roman, Early Christian
- Location: Dakhla Oasis, New Valley Governorate, Egypt
- Region: Western Desert

Site notes
- Length: 2.5 km (1.6 mi)
- Width: 1.5 km (0.93 mi)
- Archaeologists: Bernardino Drovetti, John Gardner Wilkinson, Ahmed Fakhry, Roger S. Bagnall
- Condition: In ruins

Trimithis (Ancient Greek: Τριμιθις) was an ancient Egyptian city in the Dakhla Oasis in the Western Desert. The site of the city is known today as Amheida (Arabic: أمحيدة) and is located in the New Valley Governorate of Egypt. Trimithis was a prominent urban center in Roman Egypt, with earlier occupation dating back to the Old and New Kingdoms. Under Roman rule, it featured temples, residential areas, and public buildings. Excavations have revealed a 4th-century house belonging to the wealthy councilor Serenos, a rare case of an ancient school, and a church complex.

Trimithis is notable for the rare inscriptions and wall texts preserved on plaster in the school and adjacent rooms, including literary fragments such as excerpts from a lost tragedy by Euripides, as well as Greek poems and paraphrased anecdotes from Homer and Plutarch.

Trimithis also served a military role, functioning as the headquarters of the ala I Quadorum, with a fort located at nearby el-Qasr. Evidence records the supply of provisions and attests to the presence of officers and support personnel. Research at the site began in the 19th century and has continued systematically in the early 21st century.

== Etymology ==
The Greek name of the city, Trimithis, comes from the Coptic Trimhite, meaning "northern storehouse". The modern Arabic name, also spelled Amhâdeh or Amhida, is probably derived from either the Greek or Coptic.

== History and archaeology ==
=== Overview ===
Archaeological remains from the Old Kingdom have been found at Amheida. There was a temple at the site during the New Kingdom and a stela of Seti II has also been found. Habitation at the site increased exponentially under the Roman rule. Trimithis became a recognized polis (city). It declined rapidly in late antiquity. The Roman city was built around a temple of Thoth. Including its cemetery, it covered an area of at least 2.5 by 1.5 kilometres (1.55 mi × 0.93 mi).

=== Serenos house ===
Among the remains excavated at Trimithis is a large mud-brick residence conventionally known as the house of Serenos (or B1), a place belonging to a wealthy landowner and city councilor, identified as such through ostraca. The building stood in a central residential quarter east of the city's main temple and was constructed in the mid-4th century AD atop earlier debris layers, including the remains of a Roman bath. The house seems to have been occupied for a short period, roughly 25 years, before being abandoned c. 365 AD.

The house consisted of multiple rooms organized around a central space and connected by corridors, with access from two streets. Several rooms were decorated with painted plaster. Especially notable was a domed dining room whose walls bore figural scenes drawn from Greek mythology. Other rooms display decorative schemes featuring geometric paneling, vegetal motifs, and ornamental patterns.

The house also yielded a body of texts, including short Greek inscriptions, graffiti, and dipinti found on walls, door jambs, and painted surfaces. Of particular interest is Room 13, where a chalk written line from Hypsipyle, a lost tragedy of classical Athenian playwright Euripides, was preserved on a wall, alongside painted mythological names that appear to function as captions within the decorative program. Although brief, this literary quotation has scholarly importance, as it corroborates a debated reconstruction of the play known primarily from fragmentary papyri, aligning with the opinion of Denys Page.

=== School complex ===
One of the major findings from Trimithis is an ancient school, which scholars describe as "the only building so far discovered from antiquity that was certainly a school and showed educational activities." The school, built in the mid-4th century AD, appears to have been active for less than two decades. Its operation likely depended on a single teacher, a pattern common in antiquity, such that the school ceased to function when that individual was no longer present.

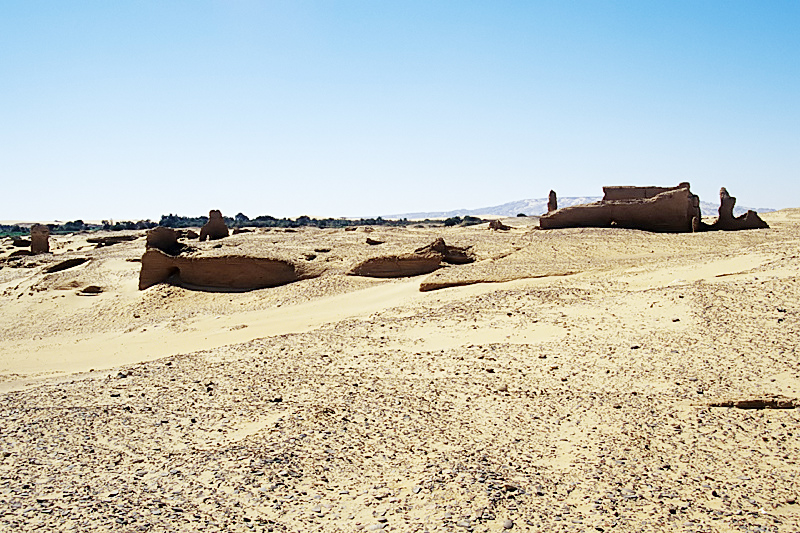
Ruins of Trimithis

The school originally consisted of at least three large rooms equipped with low benches along the perimeter walls, indicating formal instruction, with students seated to read and copy texts and standing to write on the walls. Later, one of its rooms was annexed to the house of Serenus, located immediately to its south. The school also appears to have formed part of a wider network of educational activity in the Dakhla Oasis, where other evidence attests to sustained Greek schooling in the same period.

On the walls of the school and adjacent rooms, a corpus of literary texts has been preserved. These texts, written in red ink on plaster, help reconstruct the practice of education during this period. In one of the rooms (Room 15), a long didactic poem invoking the Muses, Hermes, and the labors of Heracles and written in five columns was found; probably written by a teacher, it served as an instructional aid. The systematic use of accentuation and lectional signs suggests an emphasis on correct reading and poetic composition. Another room (Room 19) preserves two additional wall texts: a quotation from Book 4 of Homer's Odyssey concerning Helen of Troy's drug of forgetfulness, and a paraphrased anecdote seemingly derived from Plutarch concerning Ateas of the Scythians, a king portrayed as indifferent to music. Taken together, the placement of texts on the walls suggests that they were intended for repeated consultation, copying, and classroom use rather than for decoration. Variation in handwriting among the inscriptions further suggests that not all texts were written by the same person, raising the possibility that some were produced by students. The selection of the material points to an emphasis on the moral and cultural importance of education and familiarity with the Muses.

=== Church complex ===
In the 4th century AD, a church complex was established at the site, comprising a large east church and a west church. The ceiling of the east church featured a complex geometric scheme, including shapes such as elongated lozenges, pentagons, hexagons, squares, and octagons. In some instances, lozenges were arranged to form four- and eight-pointed star patterns, and hexagons and octagons contained simple floral motifs resembling six- or eight-petalled rosettes. The painted areas alternated between reddish-pink and yellow, outlined with thick black lines and filled with parallel black hatching to simulate a coffered effect.

=== Military presence ===
Literary and documentary sources identify Trimithis as the headquarters of the ala I Quadorum, as recorded in the Notitia Dignitatum. Evidence confirms Roman military presence connected with Trimithis and its hinterland. A square fort has been identified about 2 km north-northeast of the city, at a place called el-Qasr. The remains suggest a date between the 3rd and 5th centuries AD. The local name for the structure is preserved on a Coptic ostracon, which refers to it as the "imperial fort". Based on architectural parallels with other Egyptian oasis forts, the site has been associated with the fortification program initiated under Diocletian (r. 284–305 AD).

Ostraca from Trimithis confirm the presence of ala I Quadorum and indicate that the garrison of Dakhla was not limited to a single corps. Documents record the supply of provisions (annona militaris) to several military groups, including mounted archers associated with the Tentyrites, and a detachment of the legio II Traiana, which was likely temporarily stationed in the area. The texts concern provisions such as barley, oil, hay, and wine. Officials involved in these processes include exactores, actuarii, and other administrative positions. Civilian landowners, including Serenos (the owner of the Serenos house), are attested as suppliers of military provisions. Further evidence of the local military presence comes from a Greek dipinto discovered in a bathhouse complex, which records the name of Flavius Apollonius, praepositus of the camp of Trimithis. The use of the nomen Flavius dates the inscription to after 325 AD. Additional references attest to a range of military personnel present or supplied at Trimithis, including an optio, camelarius, stationarius, scribae, and a singularis. The deployment of camel-mounted troops is attested in other oasis regions of Roman Egypt.

== Research history ==
Bernardino Drovetti described the site in 1821. John Gardner Wilkinson, who saw it in 1825, was the first to record its modern name, as Lémhada, in 1843. Archaeological investigation of the site began under Ahmed Fakhry in 1963.

Excavations at Amheida began in 2004, first directed by Columbia University, and continued from 2008 to 2015 under New York University. These excavations uncovered a Roman-style bath and a 4th-century house belonging to a wealthy member of the local boule. Work was temporarily suspended during the 2011 Egyptian revolution. Excavations in 2012–2013, directed by Roger S. Bagnall, focused on the 4th-century church complex.

== See also ==
- Kom El Deka#Auditoria

== Bibliography ==
- Aravecchia, Nicola (2020). "Geometric painting in late-antique Egypt: the ceiling of a 4th-c. church at Amheida (Dakhla Oasis)". Journal of Roman Archaeology. 33: 449–466. doi:10.1017/s1047759420001117.
- Ast, Rodney; Bagnall, Roger S. (2015). "New Evidence for the Roman Garrison of Trimithis" (PDF). Tyche: Beiträge zur Alten Geschichte, Papyrologie und Epigraphik. 40: 1–7.
- Bagnall, Roger S.; Kaper, Olaf E. (2016). "Introduction". An Oasis City. New York University Press. pp. 1–10.
- Cribiore, Raffaella; Davoli, Paola (2013). "New Literary Texts from Amheida, Ancient Trimithis (Dakhla Oasis, Egypt)". Zeitschrift für Papyrologie und Epigraphik: 1–14.
- Cribiore, Raffaella (2015). "School structures, apparatus, and materials". In Bloomer, W. Martin (ed.). A Companion to Ancient Education. Chichester: Wiley-Blackwell. pp. 149–159.
