= Lecture hall =

Large instruction room in a college or university

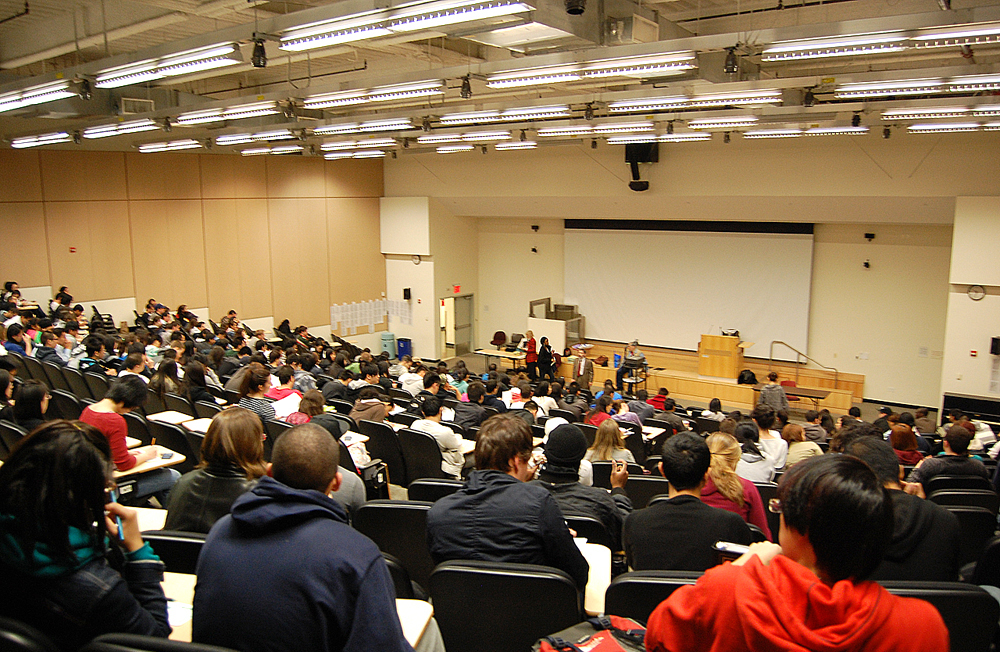
A lecture hall at Baruch College, New York City, US

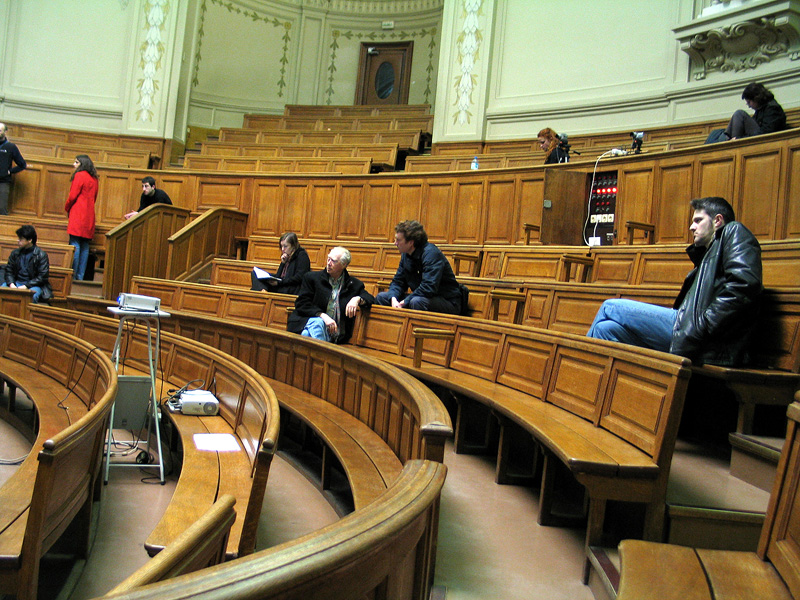
Lecture hall at the University of Paris, France

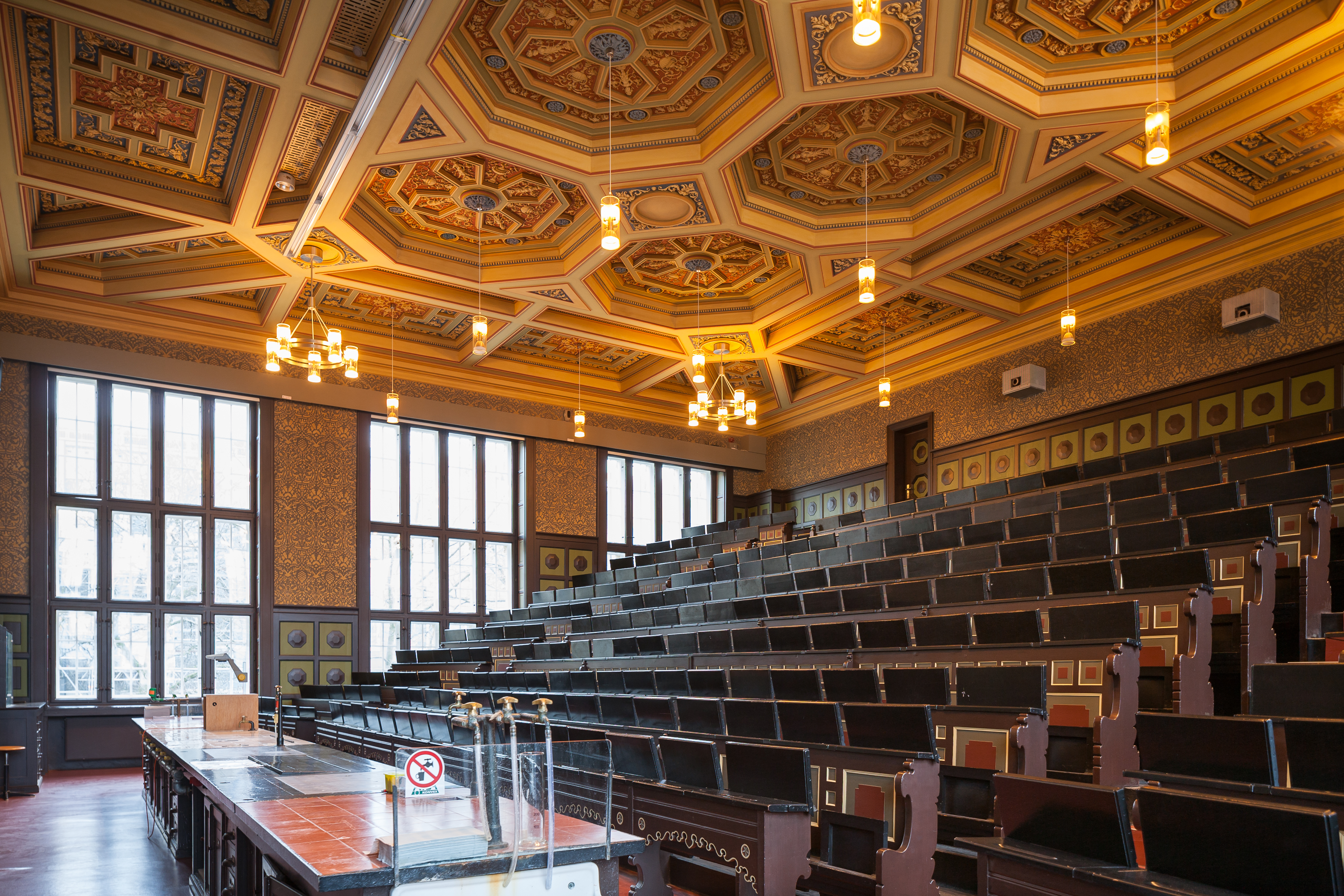
"Kali Chemie" lecture hall at the Leibniz University Hannover, Germany

A lecture hall or lecture theatre is a large room used for lectures, typically at a college or university. Unlike flexible lecture rooms and classrooms with capacities normally below one hundred, the capacity of lecture halls can sometimes be measured in the hundreds. Lecture halls frequently have tiered seating, with those in the rear sat higher than those at the front.

Lecture halls differ from other types of learning spaces, seminar rooms in particular, in that they allow for little versatility in use, although they are no less flexible than, for example, chemistry laboratories. Experimentation, group work, and other contemporary educational methods are not practicable in a lecture hall. On the other hand, lecture halls are excellent for focusing the attention of a large group on a single point, either an instructor or an audio-visual presentation, and modern lecture halls often feature audio-visual equipment. A microphone and loudspeakers are common to help the lecturer be heard, and projection screens may be used for large displays.

Studies into the use of the lecture theatre teaching space have found that students sit in specific locations due to a range of factors; these include being noticed, addressing anxiety or an ability to focus. Personal and social factors are also thought to determine students' lecture theatre seating choice and the resulting effects on attainment. Studies into the way students use the space indicate that peer group formation exerts a strong impact on attainment and engagement, with groups of similar ability sitting together.

== History ==
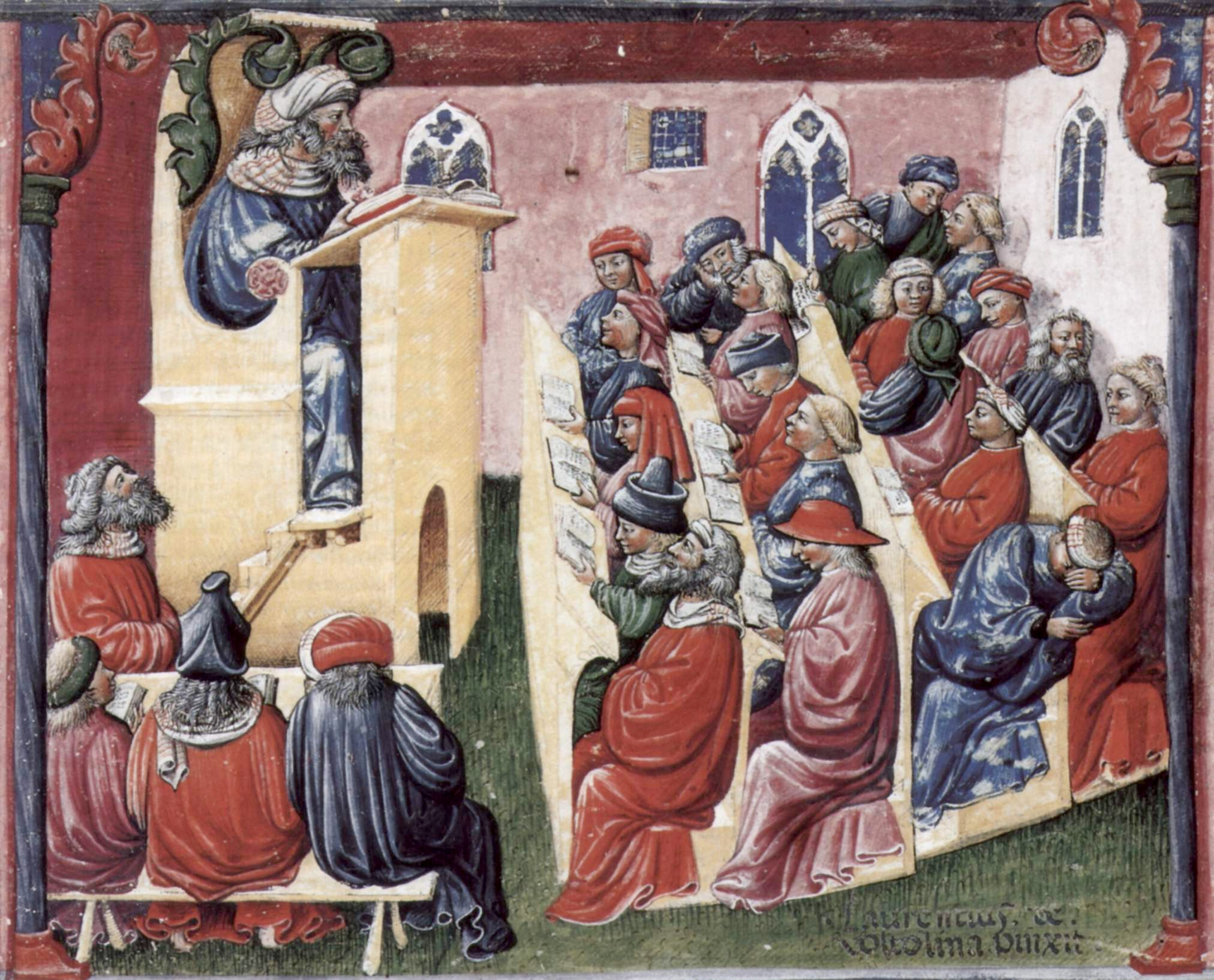
Henry of Germany delivering a law lecture to students at the University of Bologna in 1233

The use of lectures at universities dates back to the middle ages. A variety of different rooms and halls may have been used for lectures – one of the earliest images of a lecture shows Henry of Germany giving a law lecture at the University of Bologna in 1233, speaking from what appears to be a pulpit.

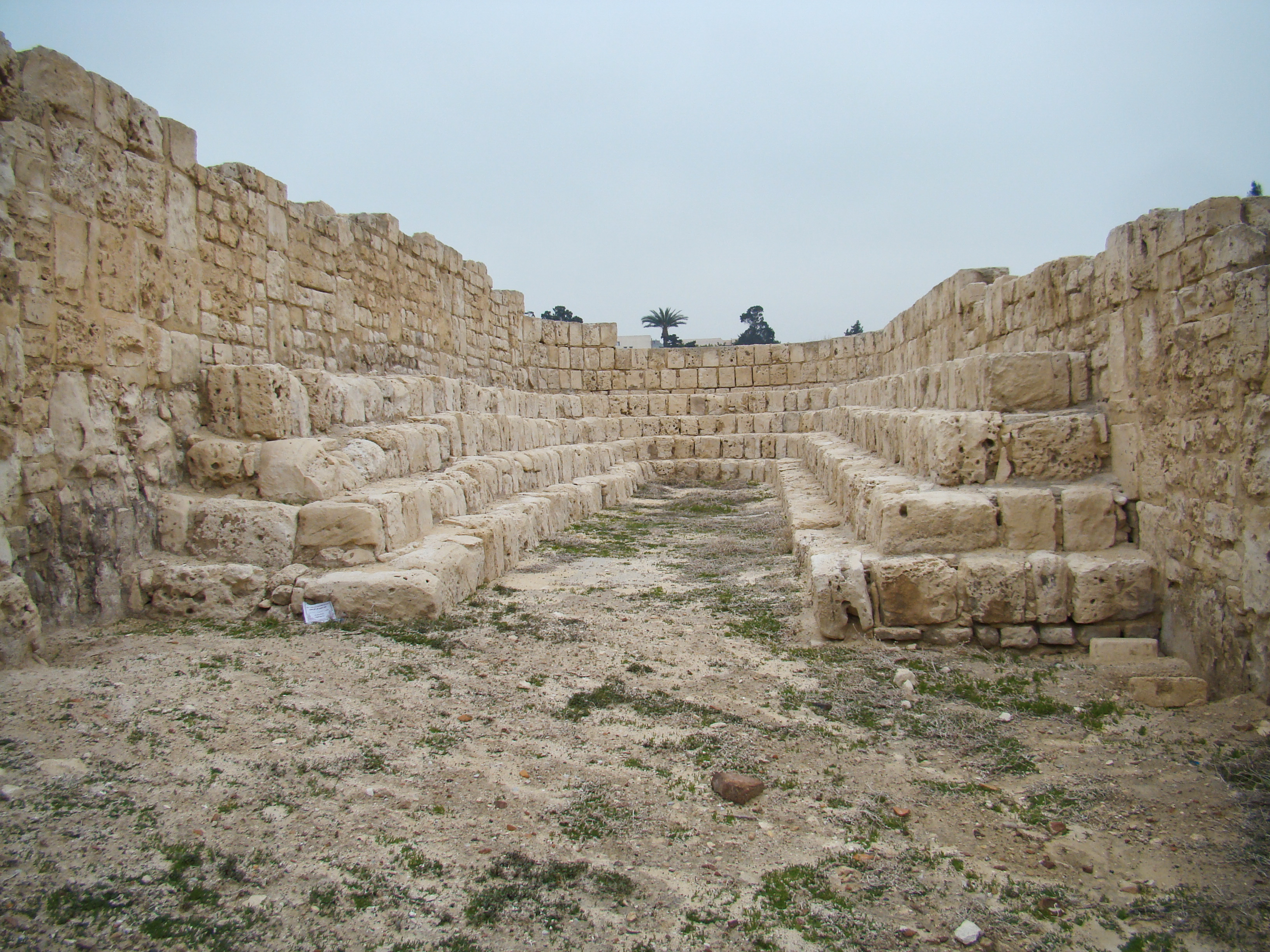
Archaeological remains at Kom El Deka interpreted as lecture theatres

Lecture theatres may go back further than this, however, with archaeological excavations at Kom El Deka, near Alexandria, having uncovered a complex of U-shaped auditoria that have been interpreted as lecture theatres from the classical period.

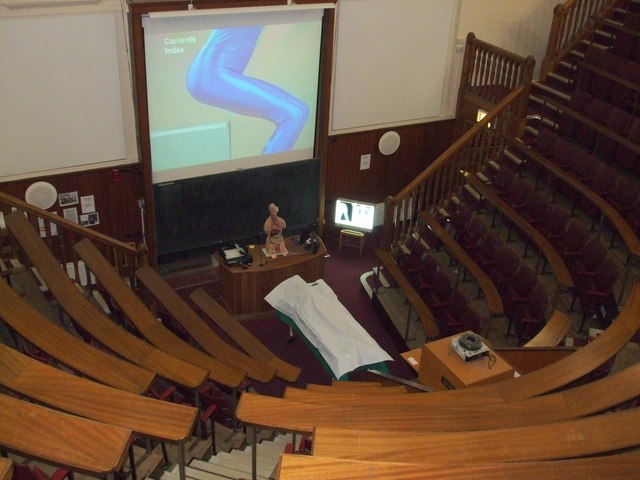
The steep rake on the Anatomy Lecture Theatre at the University of Edinburgh gives all seats a clear view of the dissection table

Tiered lecture theatres developed in Renaissance Italy, where they were used for teaching anatomy. The earliest purpose-built lecture theatre of the modern era was in Padua in 1594, but the idea spread quickly with a lecture theatre being built in Leiden in 1597 and at the Barber-Surgeons Hall in London in 1636, designed by Inigo Jones. The steep rake of these lecture theatres enabled students to see the dissection table and was copied by scientific lecture theatres to ensure the demonstration bench could be seen.

The "Harvard-style" lecture theatre developed in the late 19th century at Harvard Law School. These had a shallower rake than traditional lectures theatres and placed the seating in a U-shape rather than in arced or semi-circular rows, promoting exchanges between lecturers and students. Upholstered seating also became common in the 19th century, and desks became standard by the mid 20th century.

The 21st century saw the development of "collaborative lecture theatres", originally at the University of Queensland in 2009, with shallower-raked tiers and seating that could be turned to form small groups of student for collaborative work or to face the front for traditional lectures. These collaborative lecture theatres typically have between 100 and 200 seats. Above this size range, the early 21st century also saw the construction of "mega lecture theatres", with a variety of designs besides the traditional tiered theatre. The 630-seat mega theatre at Oregon State University is completely circular, with a raised stage for the lecturer in the centre and individual seats with writing tablets rather than desks, while the 1000-seat Klarman Hall at Harvard Business School is an auditorium, but again with individual seats and no desks. Such mega lecture theatres are designed for students to listen to the lecturer's exposition rather than to take copious notes, and the smaller writing tablets make use of laptops difficult compared to the larger desks in more traditional lecture theatres.

== Types ==
Lecture theatres come in various types, suiting different pedagogies and space restrictions. These include:

- Tiered lecture theatre: the traditional lecture theatre, with rows of tiered seats enabling the speaker and screens or boards to be seen by large numbers of people.
- Anatomical theatre or demonstration theatre: steep-tiered and designed to allow views of the dissection table or demonstration bench. Example: the Royal Institution Lecture Theatre.
- Flat lecture theatre: a flat room with a fixed lecture arrangement, distinguishing it from reconfigurable teaching rooms. Generally smaller than tiered lecture theatres; below a capacity of 50 such rooms are not normally called lecture theatres although they can be at some institutions. Example: the Gillis lecture theatre at Balliol College, Oxford.
- Harvard-style or horseshoe lecture theatre: U-shaped arrangement of seats on shallow tiers, designed to promote interaction between students and the lecturer. Example: the UCL School of Management lecture theatre on level 50 of One Canada Square.
- Retractable lecture theatre: a flat room that can be converted to a tiered lecture theatre by deploying retractable seating, allowing for a variety of uses. Example: the Fonteyn Ballroom in Dunelm House at Durham University.
- Collaborative lecture theatre: a lecture theatre with a shallow tiers designed so that seats can be turned to form collaborative booths for group work or forwards for use as a normal lecture theatre. Example: three lecture theatres in the Roger Stevens building at the University of Leeds.
- In-the-round lecture theatre: a circular arrangement with the lecturer in the centre, similar to a theatre-in-the-round. Examples include the lecture theatre of the Sloane Robinson building at the University of Bristol and lecture theatres at the University of California, Riverside and Oregon State University.

== Technology ==
The original conception of lecture theatres was as spaces for listening to a speaker talk or for viewing a scientific demonstration. The first introduction of technology was writing boards – originally chalk boards but now normally whiteboards. This was supplemented with projectors – originally slide projectors and now normally digital projectors attached to a computer. Computer systems control the audio-visual technology and may also give control of the lighting level in the room. Microphones and speakers are commonly used in larger lecture theatres to ensure the speaker can be heard.

Lecture capture technology allows for lectures to be recorded and watched later, or to be attended virtually when linked with a video conferencing system. Networking of lecture theatres can allow a lecture to be shown in multiple rooms.
