= Vine of Sodom =

Translation found in Deuteronomy

Vine of Sodom is the translation of Deuteronomy 32:32 found in the King James and some other translations of the Bible into English, most notably in the Tyndale Bible, which renders it: "Their vines are the vines of Sodom." The Douay-Rheims renders the phrase as, "Their vines are of the vineyard of Sodom," the JPS Tanakh: "The vine for them is from Sodom," and the Revised Standard Version, "For their vine comes from the vine of Sodom." The full verse in the King James Version reads: "For their vine is of the vine of Sodom, and of the fields of Gomorrah: their grapes are grapes of gall, their clusters are bitter." (Hebrew: כִּֽי־מִגֶּ֤פֶן סְדֹם֙ גַּפְנָ֔ם וּמִשַּׁדְמֹ֖ת עֲמֹרָ֑ה עֲנָבֵ֙מֹו֙ עִנְּבֵי־רֹ֔ושׁ אַשְׁכְּלֹ֥ת מְרֹרֹ֖ת לָֽמֹו׃ Kî miggep̄en Səḏōm gap̄nām, ū-miššaḏmōṯ ‘Ǎmōrāh; ‘ănāḇêmōw ‘innəḇê rōwōš, ’aškəlōṯ mərōrōṯ lāmōw.)

Among the many conjectures as to this tree, the most probable is that it is the osher (Calotropis procera) of the Arabs, which grows from Jordan to southern Egypt. The fruit of Calotropis procera is therefore called "apples of Sodom", Sodom apple, and Dead Sea apple. Although beautiful to the eye, are bitter to the taste.

Another conjecture equates it with the colocynth (Citrullus colocynthis). Its fruit are called Vine of Sodom, which, although beautiful to the eye, are bitter to the taste.

== See also ==
- Citrullus colocynthis – sometimes called "vine of Sodom"
- Ein Gedi
- Sodom and Gomorrah
