= Dakhla Oasis =

Dakhla Oasis الواحات الداخلة
- Oasis
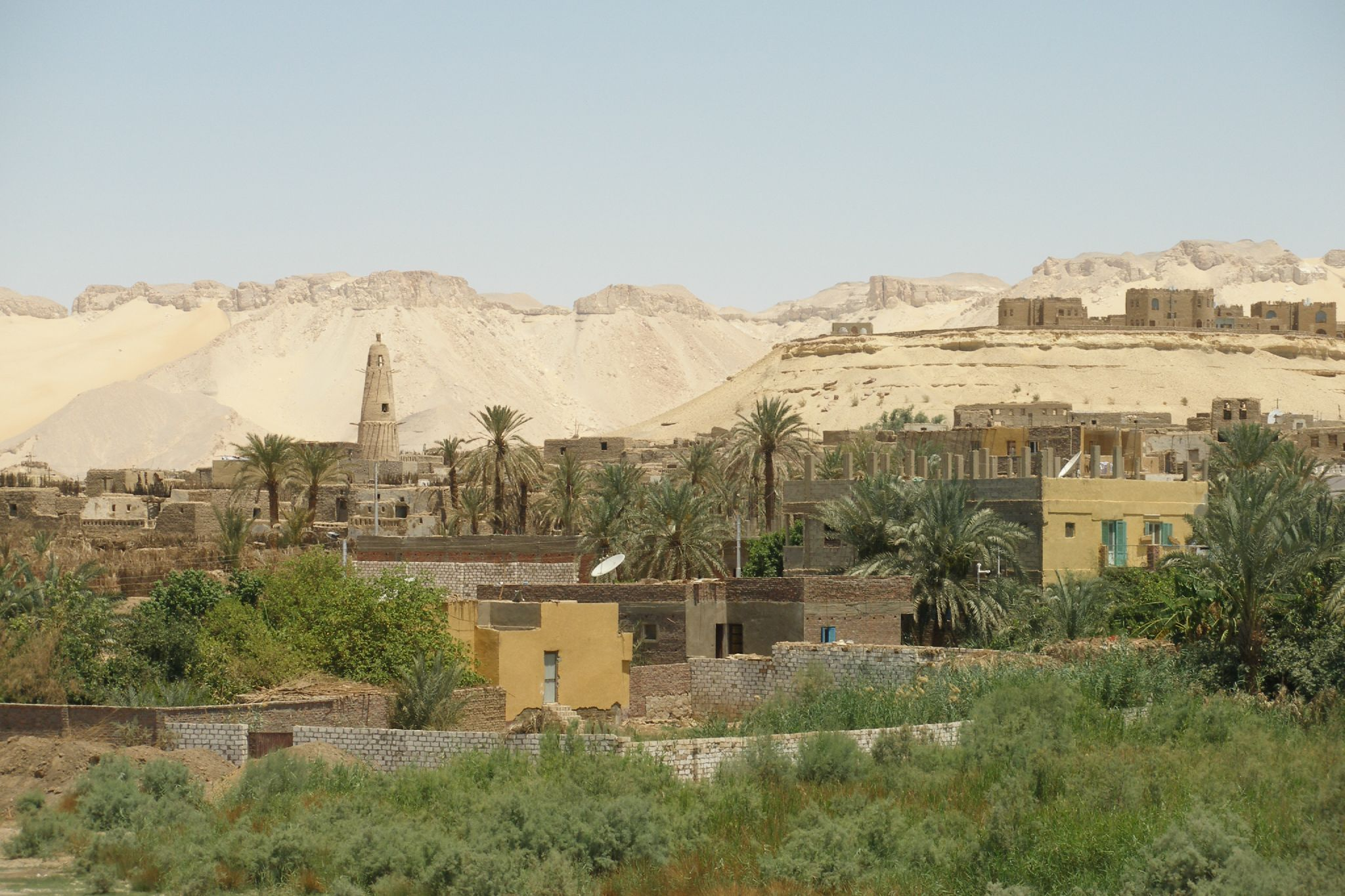
- View to Dakhla Oasis' old town, taken by Vyacheslav Argenberg
- Nickname: Inner oasis
- Location in Egypt
- Coordinates: 25°29′29.6″N 28°58′45.2″E
- Country: Egypt
- Governorate: New Valley Governorate

Area
  - Total: 2,000 km^{2} (770 sq mi)
  - Land: 1,500 km^{2} (580 sq mi)

Population (2002)
  - Total: 75,000
  - Ethnicities: Egyptians
- Time zone: UTC+2 (EET)
  - Summer (DST): UTC+3 (EEST)
- Capital: 'Ain Basil (Balat) (c. 2500 BCE-c. 1500 BCE); Mut (c. 1500 BCE- )

Dakhla Oasis or Dakhleh Oasis (Egyptian Arabic: الواحات الداخلة El Waḥat el Daḵla, pronounced [elwæ'ħæ:t edˈdæ:xlæ], "the inner oases"), is one of the seven oases of Egypt's Western Desert. Dakhla Oasis lies in the New Valley Governorate, 350 km (220 mi.) from the Nile and between the oases of Farafra and Kharga. It measures approximately 80 km (50 mi) from east to west and 25 km (16 mi) from north to south.

== History ==
=== Prehistory ===
The first contacts between the pharaonic power and the oases started around 2550 BCE. The human history of this oasis started during the Pleistocene, when nomadic tribes sometimes settled there, in a time when the Sahara climate was wetter and where humans could have access to lakes and marshes. About 6,000 years ago, the entire Sahara became drier, changing progressively into a hyper-arid desert (with less than 50 mm of rain per year). However, specialists think that nomadic hunter-gatherers began to settle almost permanently in the oasis of Dakhleh in the period of the Holocene (about 12,000 years ago), during new, but rare episodes of wetter times.

The drier climate didn't mean that there was less water than today in what is now known as the Western Desert. The south of the Libyan Desert has the most important supply of subterranean water in the world through the Nubian Aquifer, and the first inhabitants of the Dakhla Oasis had access to surface water sources. In the 3rd millennium BC the probably nomadic people of the Sheikh Muftah culture lived there.

=== Pharaonic period ===
During the late 6th Dynasty, hieratic script was sometimes incised into clay tablets with a stylus, similar to cuneiform. About five hundred such tablets have been discovered in the governor's palace at Ayn Asil (Balat) in the Dakhla Oasis. At the time the tablets were made, Dakhla was located far from centers of papyrus production. These tablets record inventories, name-lists, accounts, and approximately fifty letters.

=== Deir el-Hagar ===
Deir el-Hagar (Egyptian Arabic: دير الحجر 'Monastery of Stone', Ancient Egyptian: S.t-wȝḥ, Sioua) is a Roman sandstone temple on the western edge of Dakhla Oasis, about 10 km from Qasr ad-Dakhla. The Temple was erected during the reign of the Roman Emperor Nero, and decorated during the time of Vespasian, Titus and Domitian. The temple was dedicated to the Theban triad, composed of Amun-Ra, Mut and Khonsu, as well as to Seth, the main deity of the region.

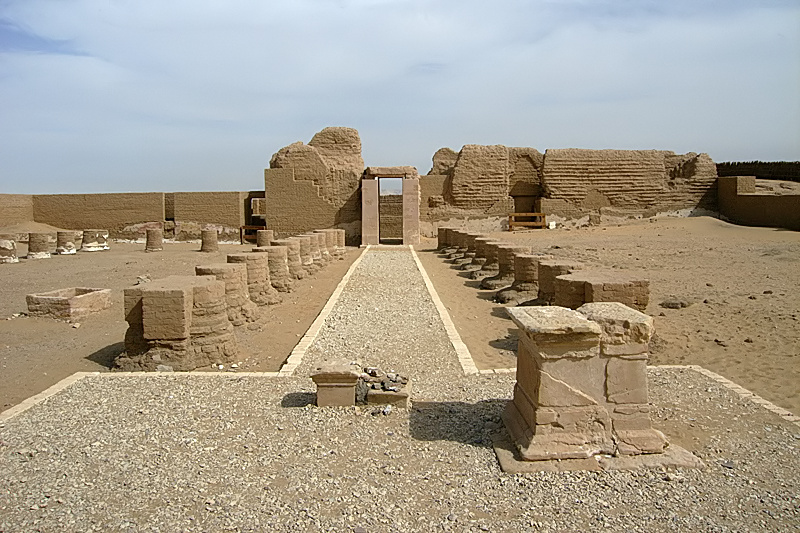
Gateway of the temple

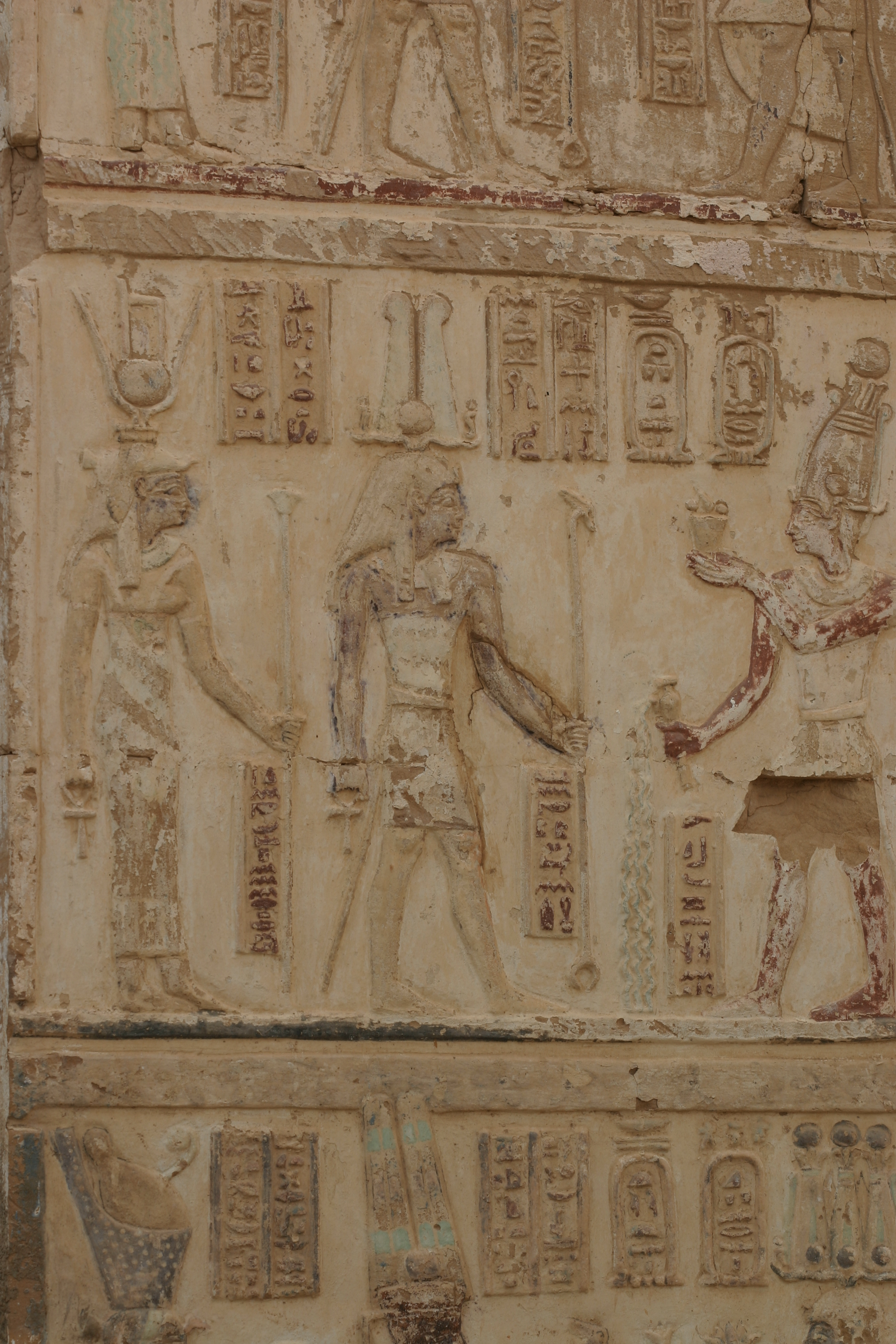
Roman emperor as pharaoh making offerings to Isis and Osiris

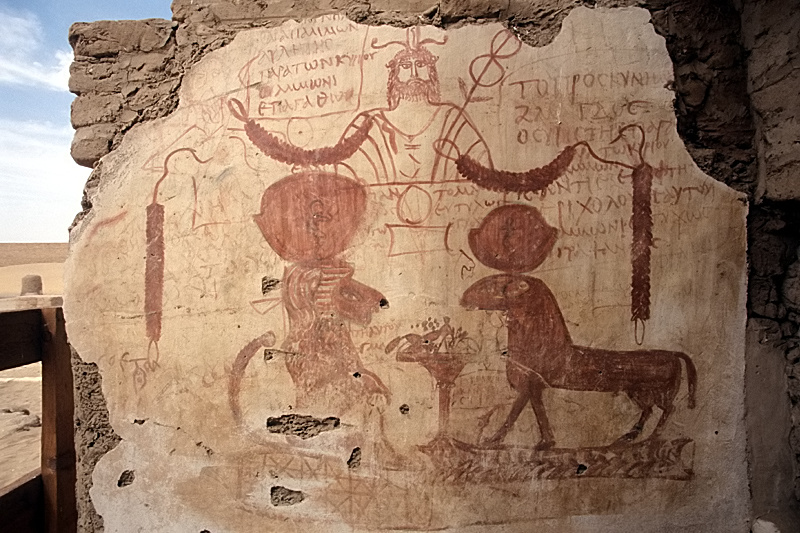
Graffiti of Sarapammon with ram and baboon

=== Qasr ad-Dakhla ===
The fortified Islamic town of Qasr ad-Dakhla or el-Qasr (Arabic: قصر الداخلة, the Fortress) was built in the 12th century on the remains of a Roman fort in the NW of the Dakhla Oasis by the Ayyubid kings. Many of the up to four-storey mud brick Ottoman and Mamluk buildings contain blocks of stone with hieroglyphics from the ancient Thoth temple of the nearby site of Amheida. The three-storey, 21-meter-high minaret is dated 924 CE.

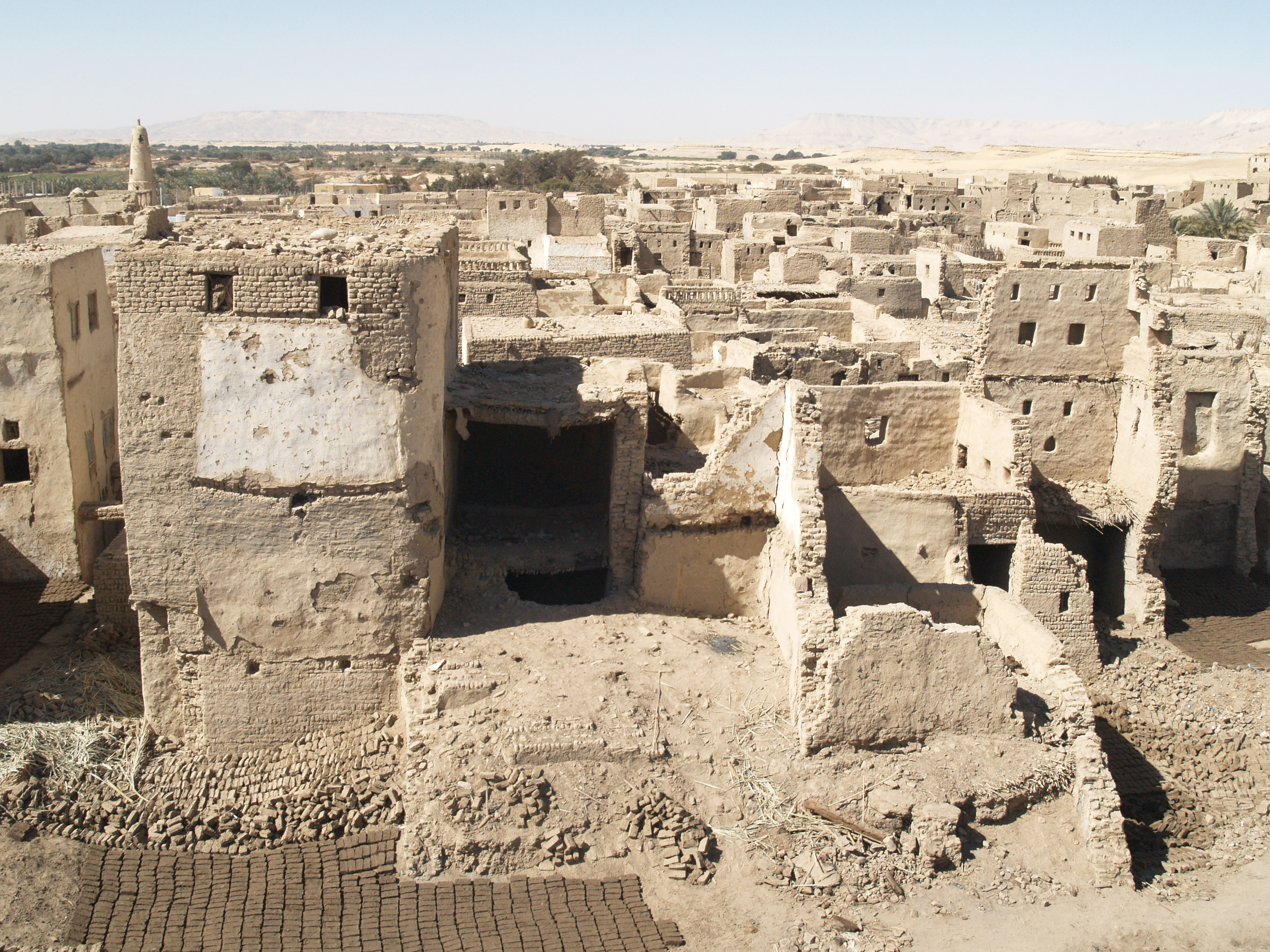
General view of Qasr el-Dakhla

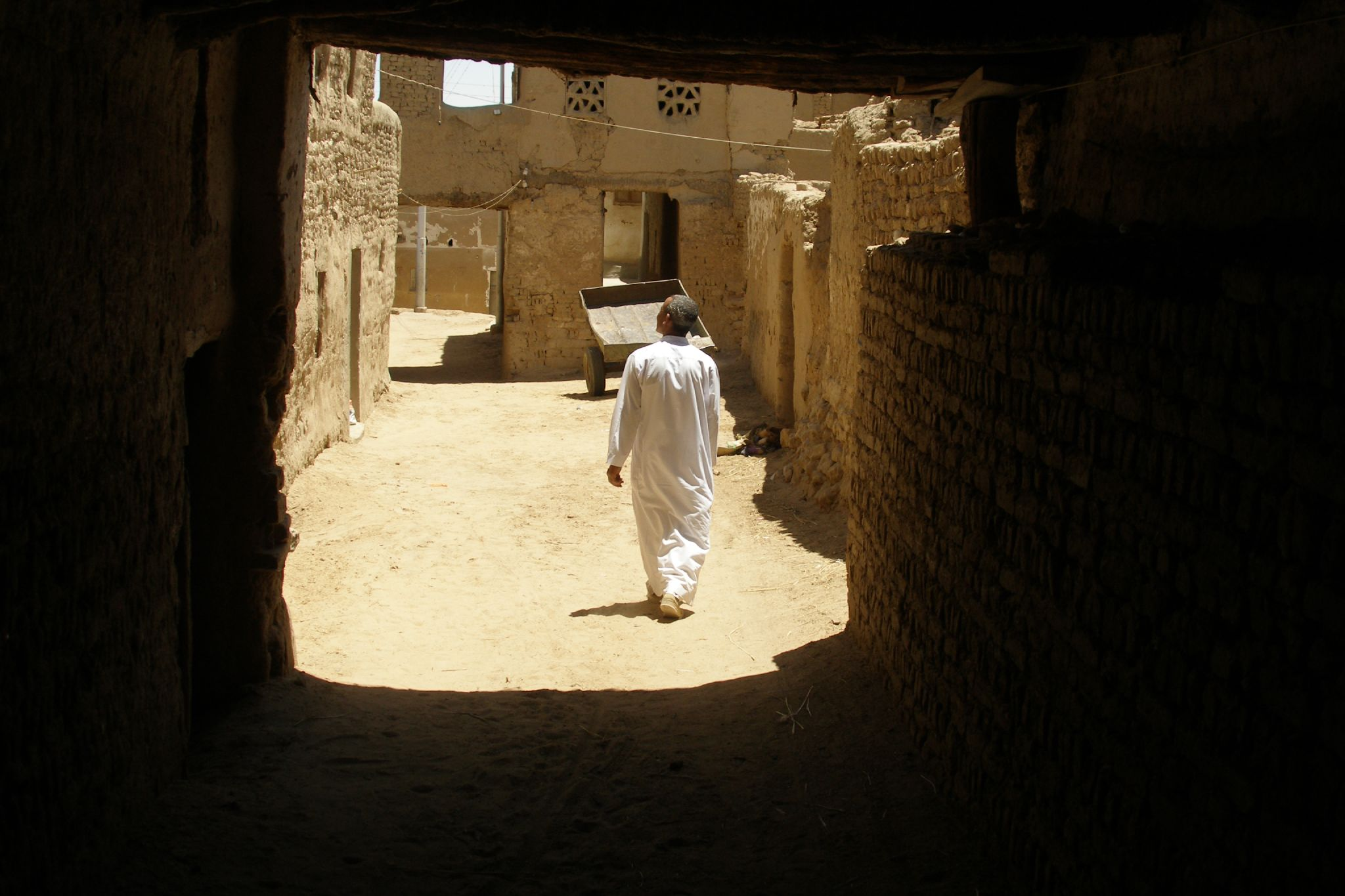
Streets of Al-Qasr

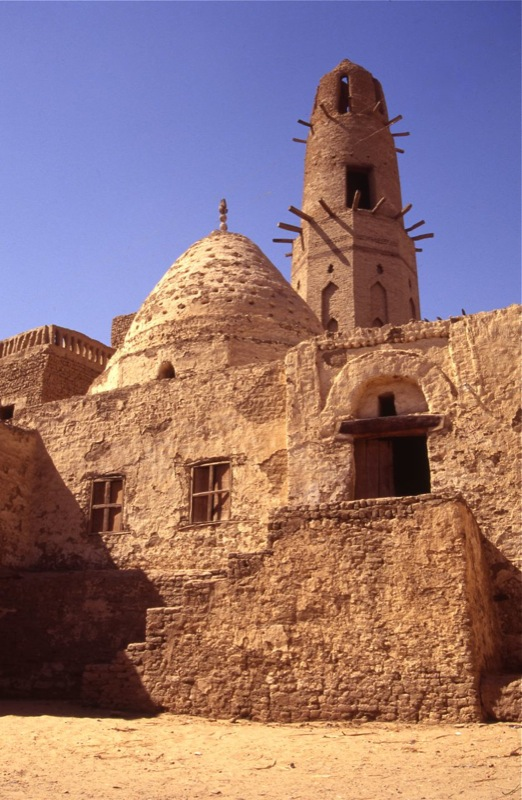
Abuyyid minaret

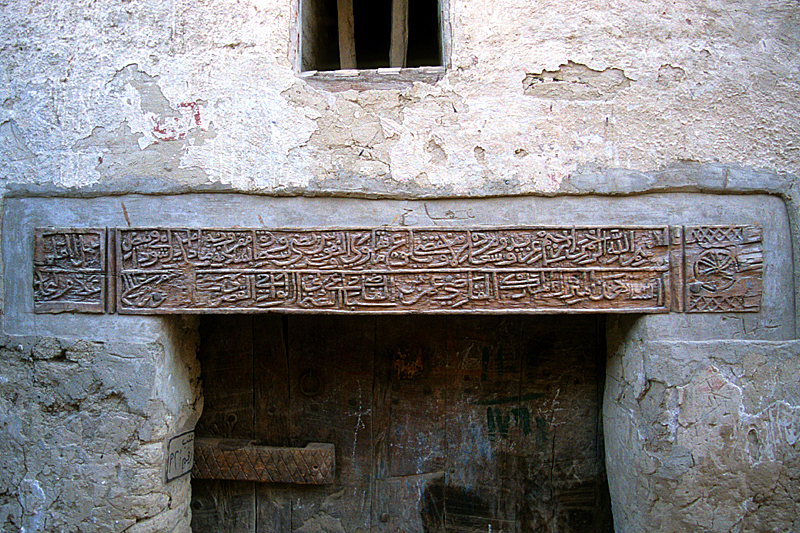
Lintel in Qasr el-Dakhla

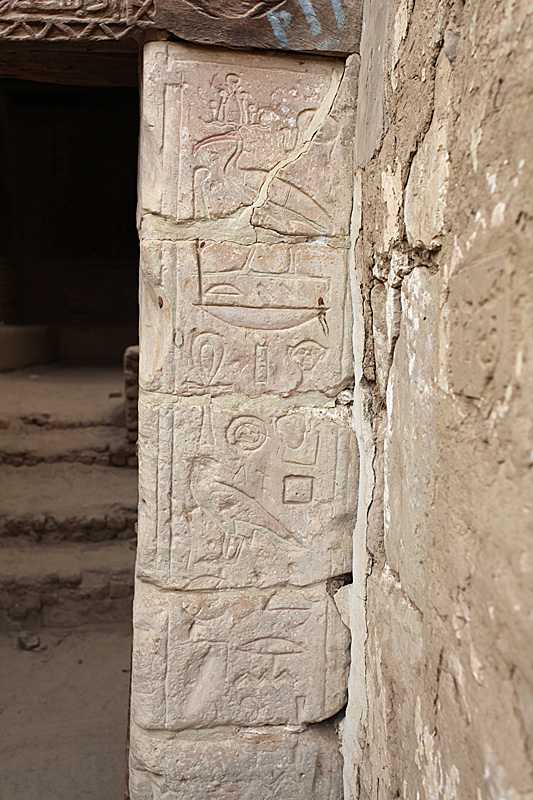
Hieroglyphic inscriptions

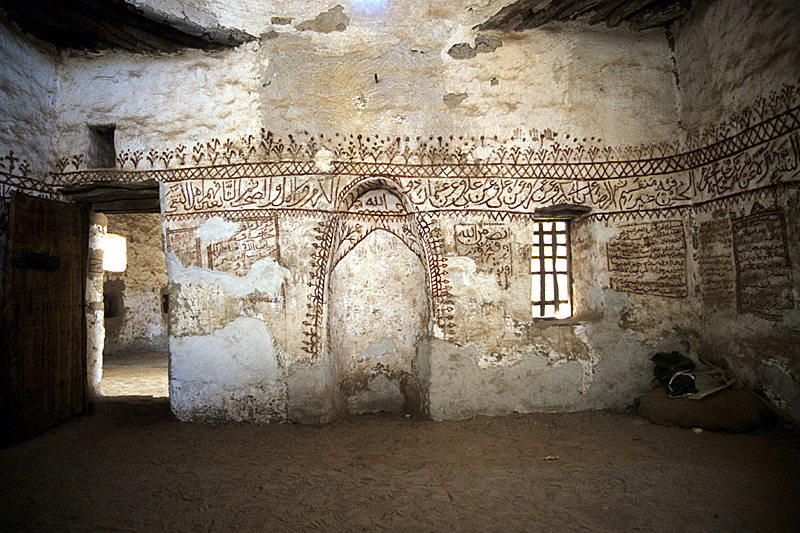
Inside the Nasr el-Din mosque

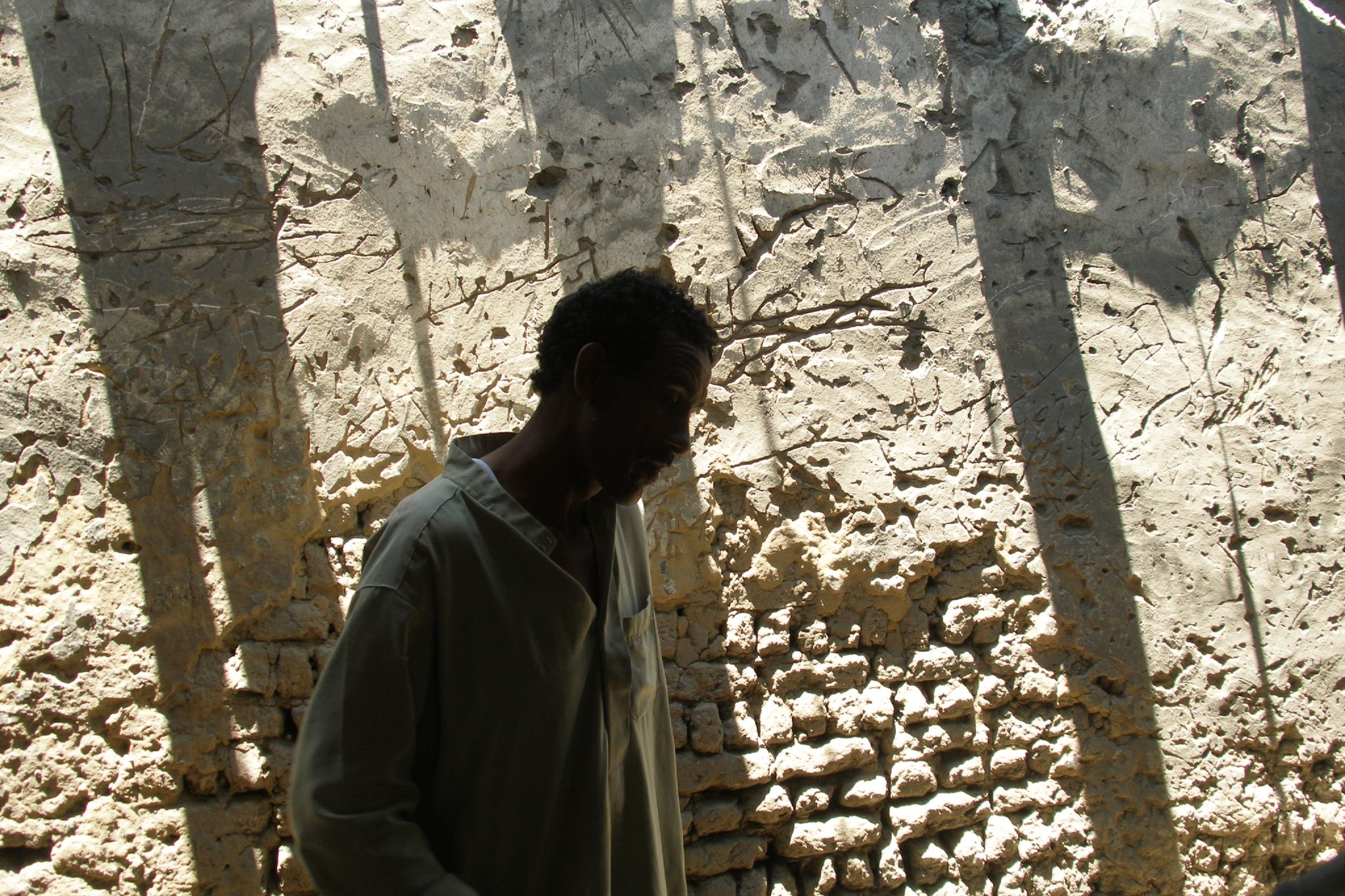
Clay house

=== After 1800 ===
Sir Archibald Edmonstone visited Dakhla oasis in the year 1819. He was succeeded by several other early travellers, among whom Friedrich Gerhard Rohlfs in 1873–1874. It was not until 1908 that the first Egyptologist, Herbert Winlock, visited Dakhla Oasis and noted its monuments in some systematic manner. In the 1950s, detailed studies began, first by Ahmed Fakhry, and in the late 1970s, expeditions of the Institut Français d'Archéologie Orientale and the Dakhleh Oasis Project (see below) each began detailed studies in the oasis.

=== Recent discoveries ===
In August 2017, archaeologists from the Ministry of Antiquities announced the discovery of five mud-brick tombs at Bir esh-Shaghala, dating back nearly 2000 years. Researchers also found worn masks gilded with gold, several large jars and a piece of pottery with unsolved ancient Egyptian writing on it.

Some of the tombs are completely large containing several burial chambers, while one tomb has a roof built in the shape of a pyramid and some of them with vaulted roofs.

In July 2026, an Egyptian archaeological mission excavating the Dakhla Oasis uncovered a 4th-century CE Byzantine residential city comprising a planned street network, residential quarters, a basilica church, two watchtowers, and a fortified structure with thick defensive walls. Archaeologists also identified houses with vaulted roofs, bread ovens, kitchens, stone grinding tools, bronze and gold coins, and more than 200 inscribed pottery fragments (ostraca) documenting economic transactions and daily activities. One residence, identified through inscriptions as belonging to a deacon named Tisous, is interpreted as having served as a house church before the construction of the basilica. The discovery provides evidence for urban organization, religious life, and economic activity in the Byzantine period of Egypt.

== Geography ==
Dakhla Oasis consists of several communities, along a string of sub-oases. The main settlements are Mut (more fully Mut el-Kharab and anciently called Mothis), El-Masara, Al-Qasr, together with several smaller villages.

== Climate ==
Dakhla Oasis has a hot desert climate (Köppen climate classification BWh), typical of much of Egypt.

Climate data for Dakhla
Month	Jan	Feb	Mar	Apr	May	Jun	Jul	Aug	Sep	Oct	Nov	Dec	Year
Record high °C (°F)	33.2 (91.8)	40.1 (104.2)	44.8 (112.6)	46.1 (115.0)	48.0 (118.4)	49.5 (121.1)	45.2 (113.4)	45.5 (113.9)	45.2 (113.4)	44.2 (111.6)	39.3 (102.7)	32.9 (91.2)	49.5 (121.1)
Mean daily maximum °C (°F)	21.5 (70.7)	24.0 (75.2)	28.1 (82.6)	33.6 (92.5)	37.3 (99.1)	38.9 (102.0)	39.0 (102.2)	38.4 (101.1)	36.4 (97.5)	32.9 (91.2)	27.1 (80.8)	22.8 (73.0)	31.7 (89.1)
Daily mean °C (°F)	12.0 (53.6)	14.2 (57.6)	18.3 (64.9)	23.6 (74.5)	28.4 (83.1)	30.8 (87.4)	30.9 (87.6)	30.4 (86.7)	28.4 (83.1)	24.3 (75.7)	18.1 (64.6)	13.7 (56.7)	22.8 (73.0)
Mean daily minimum °C (°F)	3.5 (38.3)	5.1 (41.2)	8.7 (47.7)	13.4 (56.1)	18.3 (64.9)	21.6 (70.9)	22.3 (72.1)	21.6 (70.9)	20.2 (68.4)	16.2 (61.2)	9.9 (49.8)	5.3 (41.5)	13.8 (56.8)
Record low °C (°F)	−3.9 (25.0)	−3.8 (25.2)	−0.8 (30.6)	2.1 (35.8)	7.4 (45.3)	12.4 (54.3)	15.4 (59.7)	15.2 (59.4)	12.2 (54.0)	7.7 (45.9)	1.0 (33.8)	−2.1 (28.2)	−3.9 (25.0)
Average precipitation mm (inches)	0 (0)	0 (0)	0 (0)	0 (0)	0 (0)	0 (0)	0 (0)	0 (0)	0 (0)	0 (0)	0 (0)	0 (0)	0 (0)
Average precipitation days (≥ 1.0 mm)	0.1	0	0	0	0.1	0	0	0	0	0	0	0	0.2
Average relative humidity (%)	47	41	35	29	26	24	26	28	31	36	43	47	34.4
Mean monthly sunshine hours	294.5	279.7	316.2	315.0	356.5	366.0	384.4	375.1	336.0	328.6	300.0	291.4	3,943.4
Mean daily sunshine hours	9.5	9.9	10.2	10.5	11.5	12.2	12.4	12.1	11.2	10.6	10.0	9.4	10.8
Source 1: NOAA
Source 2: Arab Meteorology Book (sun)

== Dakhleh Oasis Project ==
The Dakhleh Oasis Project (DOP) is a long-term study project of the Dakhleh Oasis and the surrounding palaeo-oasis, initiated in 1978 when the Royal Ontario Museum and the Society for the Study of Egyptian Antiquities were awarded a joint concession for part of the Oasis. In 1979, the Centre for Archaeology and Ancient History at Monash University began to cooperate in the project.

The DOP studies the interaction between environmental changes and human activity in the Dakhleh Oasis. The excavations at Ismant el-Kharab (ancient Kellis), Mut el-Kharab (ancient Mothis), Deir Abu Metta and Muzawwaqa were undertaken with the cooperation of Monash University. The DOP has also excavated at 'Ain el-Gazzareen, El Qasr el-Dakhil, Deir el Hagar and Ain Birbiyeh.

In 1985, the Petroglyph Unit of the Dakhleh Oasis Project was created by Lech Krzyżaniak, then director of the Archaeological Museum in Poznań, under the auspices of the Polish Centre of Mediterranean Archaeology University of Warsaw. At first, the studies of the petroglyphs focused on the eastern part of the oasis, where rock carvings had been documented by archaeologists already before World War II (Herbert Winlock and Hans Alexander Winkler). The expedition created systematic documentation of both the depictions mentioned earlier in the literature and the newly discovered ones. Aerial photographs proved helpful in this work. Then, under the direction of Michał Kobusiewicz from the Institute of Archaeology and Ethnology of the Polish Academy of Sciences, attention was turned to the area of the Central Oasis where 270 new petroglyph sites were recorded. The current director of The Petroglyph Unit, Paweł Polkowski from the Archaeological Museum in Poznań, extended the area of prospection and created a map showing the distribution of more than 1,300 panels with rock art. The depictions date from the Prehistory to the Islamic period and include images of animals and people (often pregnant women), hieroglyphs, and Beduin markings.

In addition to the Dakhleh Oasis Project, long-term excavations have been conducted in Balat (IFAO), Amheida (New York University) and Bir el-Shaghala (Egyptian Supreme Council of Antiquities).

== Dakhleh Trust ==
The Dakhleh Trust was formed in 1999 and is a registered charity in Britain. Its declared aim is to advance understanding of the history of the environment and cultural evolution throughout the Quaternary period in the eastern Sahara, and particularly in the Dakhla Oasis. To this end, the present trustees have committed themselves to supporting the DOP.
