= Kom El Deka =

Kom El Deka كوم الدكة
- Kom El-Dikka
- Location in Egypt
- Coordinates: 31.196687°N 29.90564°E
- Country: Egypt
- Governorate: Alexandria
- City: Alexandria
- Time zone: UTC+2 (EET)
  - Summer (DST): UTC+3 (EEST)

Kom El Deka (Arabic: كوم الدكة), also known as Kom el-Dikka, is a neighborhood and archaeological site in Alexandria, Egypt. Early Kom El-Dikka was a well-off residential area, and later it was a major civic center in Alexandria, with a bath complex (thermae), auditoria (lecture halls), and a theatre. Today, Kom el-Dikka is the largest and most complete above ground archeological site in Alexandria. It provides large amounts of archeological evidence of urban life in Roman Egypt, including early villas and their mosaics, and late Roman public works.

== History ==
The Early Roman Period, dating from the 1st-3rd century AD, contains the earliest well preserved structures. In this period, Kom el-Dikka contained mainly large villas. In the late 3rd century, the area was badly damaged by a combination of Palmyrene invasion, Aurelian’s siege, and Diocletian’s repressions.

The Late Roman-Byzantine Period, dating from the 4th-7th century, saw a very changed neighborhood. Public works replaced private houses, and the site was notably dominated by a large imperial bath complex, as well as a theater and a series of auditoria. These public works were constructed together, and were intertwined in their construction. With these buildings, Kom el-Dikka served as a major civic center in Alexandria.

== Current archaeological research ==
Archaeological research on Kom el-Dikka was initiated in 1960 by Prof. Kazimierz Michałowski. At present, the work is still conducted by a Polish-Egyptian archaeological and conservation expedition from the Polish Centre of Mediterranean Archaeology University of Warsaw (PCMA UW) and the Egyptian Ministry of Tourism and Antiquities (formerly Ministry of Antiquities). The current project director is Prof. Grzegorz Majcherek from the PCMA UW.

Since 2017, tourists can visit the most important parts of the site. The archaeological park on Kom el-Dikka was designed by architect Wojciech Kołątaj, who had directed the archaeological expedition for several years and had reconstructed many of the buildings. For these achievements, he received the Professor Jan Zachwatowicz Award, presented by the Polish Committee of ICOMOS.

== Archaeology ==
=== Bath complex ===
The baths were constructed in the 4th century, though the exact dating is unclear. They were rebuilt at least twice, first after an earthquake in 447, and second after an earthquake in 535. Due to their size and symmetrical design, they were likely built with imperial funds. Their style is typical of Roman baths, featuring an apodyterium, frigidarium, tepidarium, destrictarium, sudatorium, caldarium, large pool, furnaces, and storerooms. The early construction was made of brick, but later the baths used a brick-on-block construction. This expansion added apartments and shops to the bath complex. The bath complex's water was supplied by a large cistern, which was the only above ground water reservoir in the city.

=== Auditoria ===
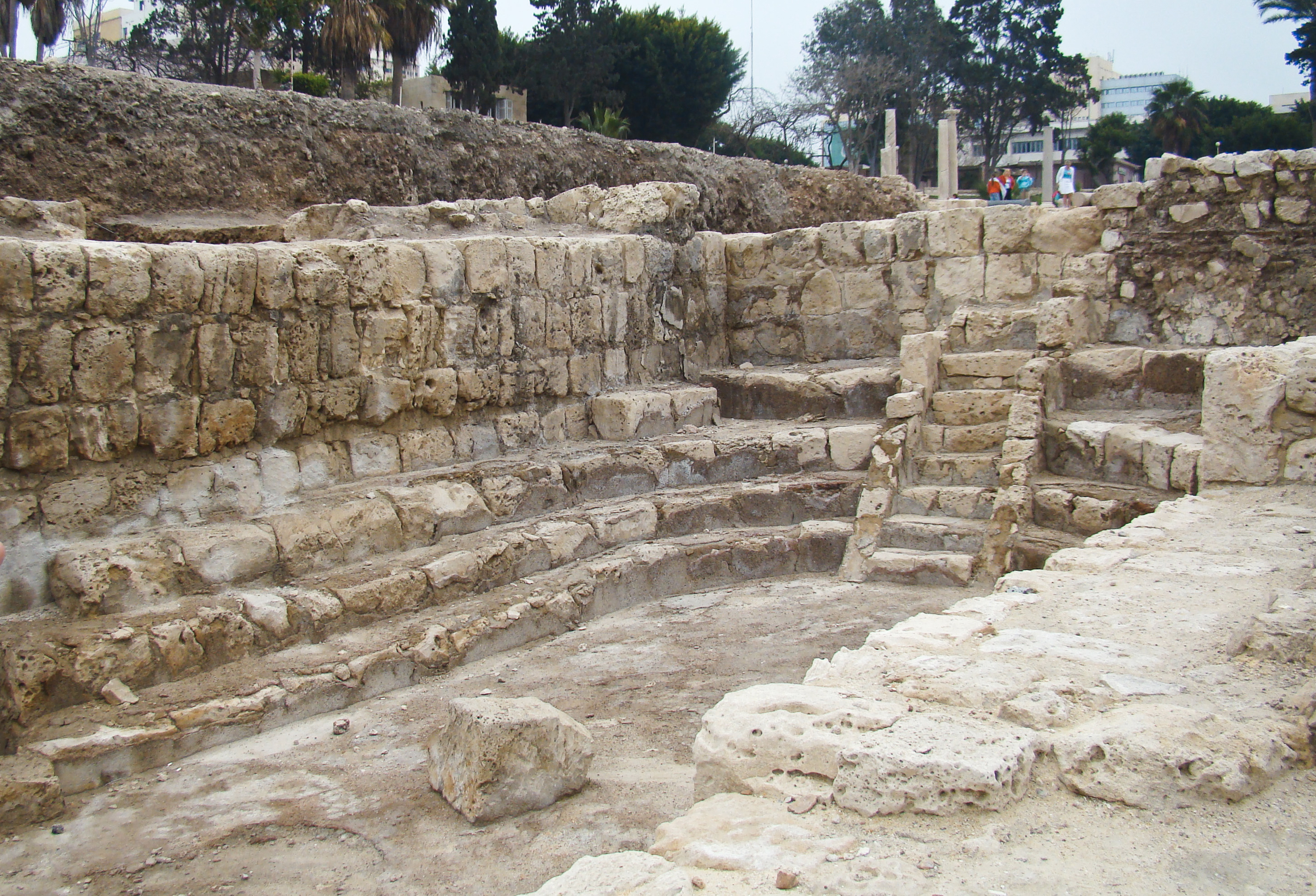
An auditorium at Kom el-Dikka

The academic complex consists of at least twenty auditoria, or lecture halls, split into two groups. These would have served as a "university", or place of higher education, and serve as archaeological confirmation of the abundance of study of rhetoric, philosophy, and medicine in Alexandria from the 5th to 7th centuries AD. Their construction began with the other public works in the 4th century. There may be more auditoria, but only twenty have been excavated as of 2010. The two groups are divided by the passage to the bath complex, and it is likely that there are more groups across the street, but outside of the excavation area. Although most of the auditoria have the same orientation along the north–south axis; they differ in size and arrangement. All auditoria feature stone benches, with most having two or three benches along the walls or a horseshoe arrangement. Capacity was generally 20–30 students per lecture hall, with facilities comfortably supporting a total of 500–600 students.

=== Theatre ===
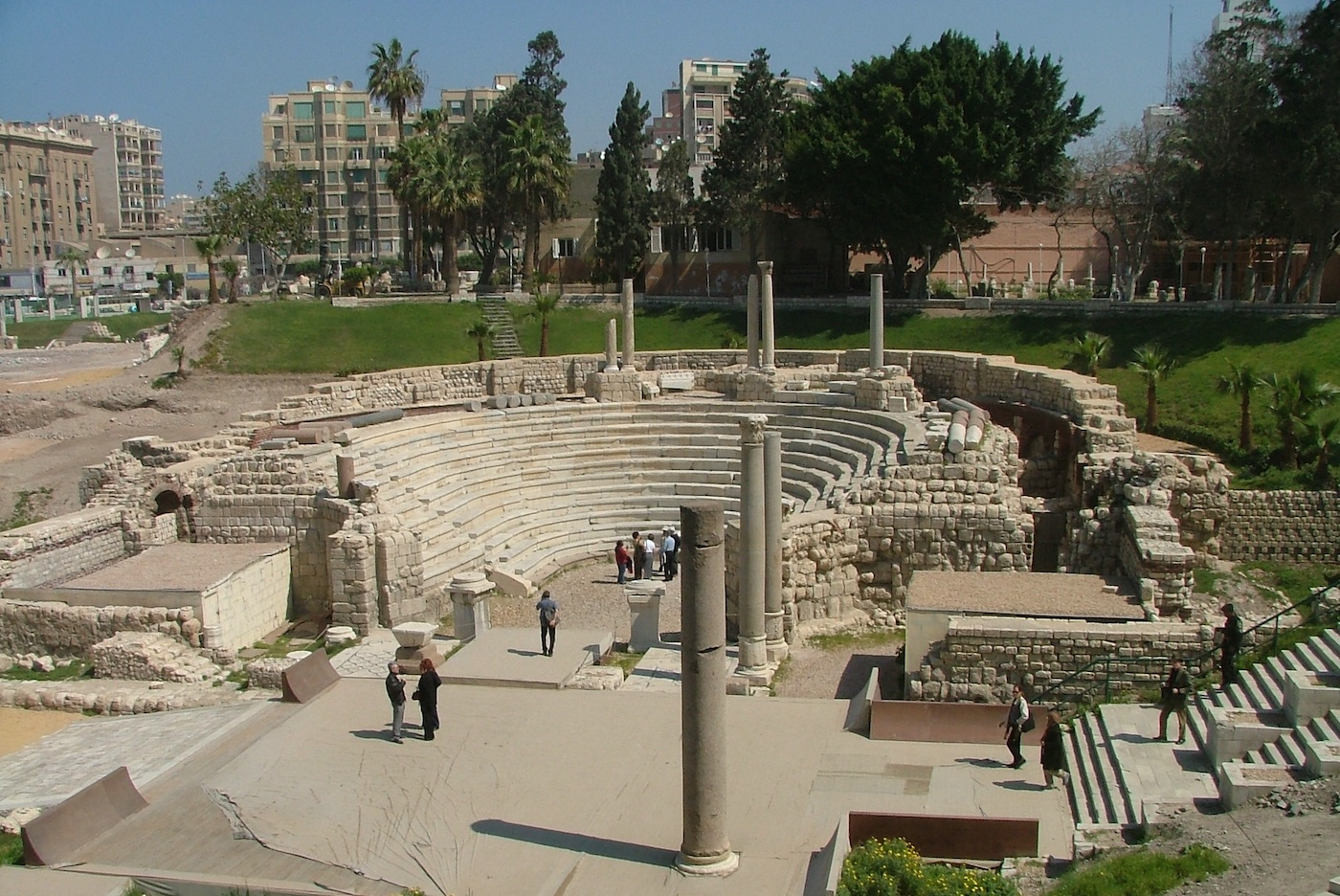
The Roman theatre

The theatre is a small Roman theatre used for various forms of entertainment. It was constructed in the 4th century and ran until the early 7th century, with a remodeling around 500. Its early use may have been for city council meetings as well as entertainment. Graffiti in the seats from the 6th century shows support for the Blue and Green factions, popular teams of charioteers, though the theatre was not large enough for racing. The exact forms of entertainment at the theatre are unknown, but there is evidence for musical performances and wrestling. After the construction of the academic complex, the theatre may have also hosted academic activities such as public orations and rhetorical speeches. The construction of the theatre is an extended hemicycle with raked auditorium seats. The seats are made of marble recycled from older structures. The walls and vestibule are made of limestone. At its top are a row of unmatched columns, recycled from other structures.

=== Houses ===
In the Early Roman Period, from the 1st–3rd century AD, Kom el-Dikka was occupied by large villas known for their elaborate mosaic floors. In the western part, three villas have been preserved. The destruction of the 3rd century and systemic pilfering have caused most of the structure of the buildings from this period to be lost, but the floor mosaics have been preserved.

The Late Roman-Byzantine Period from the 4th–7th century saw massive amounts of rebuilding. Instead of large villas, Kom el-Dikka was occupied by simpler but more standardized houses. The trend of regular houses was contrasted by the fact that many houses were built upon and using older structures. Older walls were often used as foundations for new ones, though where houses weren't defined by the foundations they were built on top of, they often showed regular patterns. Shops in the fronts of houses became much more common, and workshops often appeared in the parts of houses that didn't face the street. As demand for more living space went up, buildings began to expand into the street, causing large streets to turn into narrow alleys.

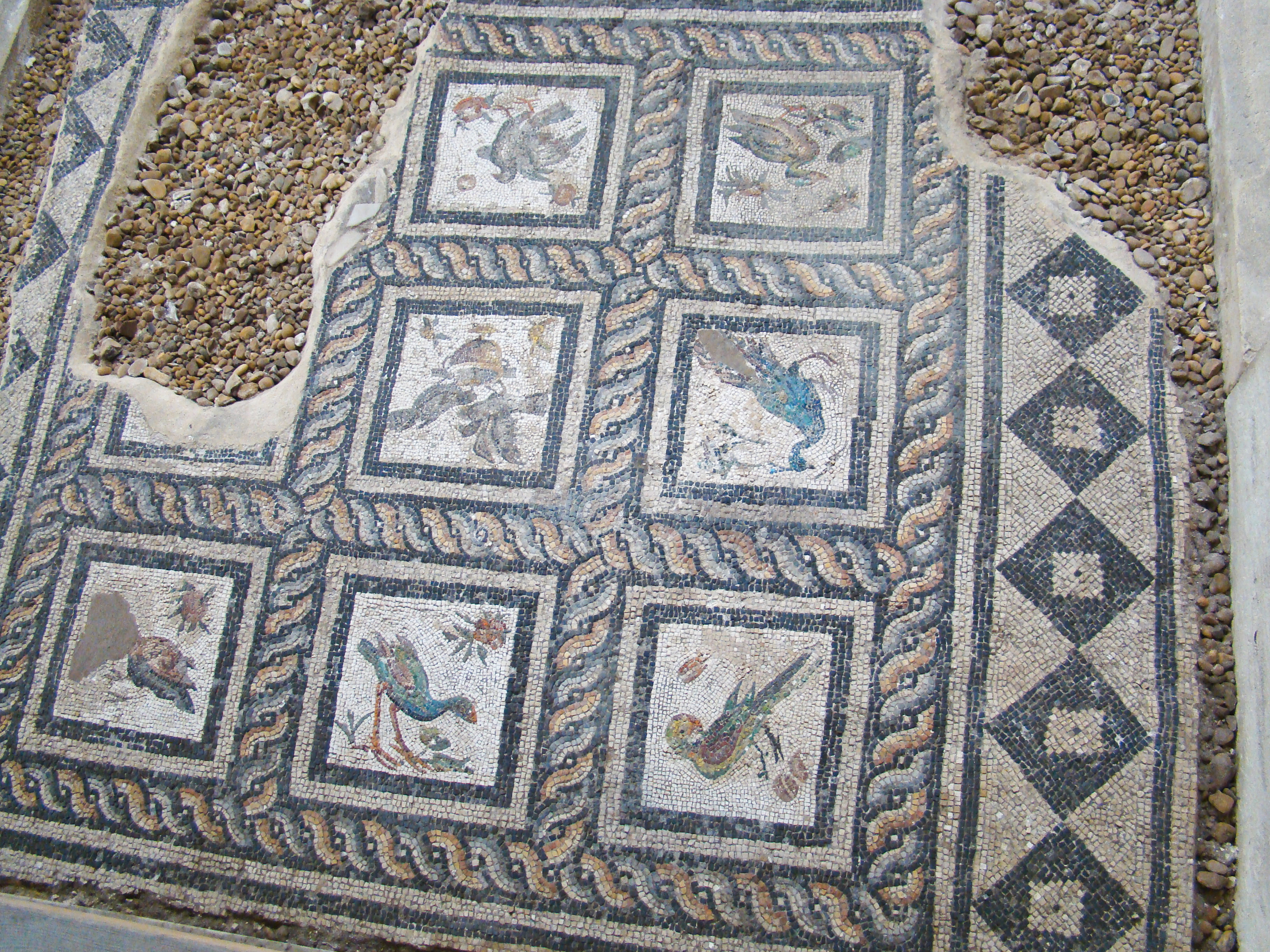
Mosaic α-5 in the Villa of the Birds

==== Villa of the Birds ====
The Villa of the Birds was a villa in the Early Roman Period. It is known for its well preserved mosaics, which are the only mosaics that can be viewed in their original environment in Alexandria. The villa was likely built some time in the 1st century AD, and was destroyed by a fire some time in the late 3rd century. Although it was subsequently plundered for materials and occupied for a long period of time, the mosaics survived in relatively good condition. Four mosaics, totaling almost 110 square feet, have been preserved, with two fully preserved and two partially preserved. One of them, α-5, features nine different birds in nine separate squares, and gives the villa its name. The art of birds is Egyptian in style, but also draws influence from other western provinces and Pergamon.

== See also ==
- Neighborhoods in Alexandria
- Trimithis#School complex
