= Sheikh Muftah culture =

Egyptian neolithic culture

- Geographical range: Western Desert
- Period: Neolithic
- Dates: c. 3200 BC – c. 2000
- Preceded by: Bashendi culture
- Followed by: Egypt

The Sheikh Muftah culture is attested in the western desert of Egypt and flourished in the 3rd millennium BCE, from about 3200–2000 BCE. They were most likely nomads.

The culture's economy was primarily based on cattle and goat herding. Hunting animals, mainly gazelles, is also attested but seems to be rarer. Their pottery was mainly found at different sites near the oases of Dakhla and Kharga. Ceramics imported from the Nile valley are also common.

== Archaeology ==
Few man-made structures were found at the excavated sites. The main and best recorded site were excavated just North of the Old Kingdom town of Ayn Asil. The only remains are fireplaces and pits. The Sheikh Muftah culture people used stone tools.

=== Pottery vessels ===
Typical artifacts of the Sheikh Muftah culture are pottery vessels, made of clay that is found at the oases, and of another clay also known from contemporary Egyptian pottery. Most vessels are simple bowls – decorated pottery is rare.

=== Clayton Rings ===
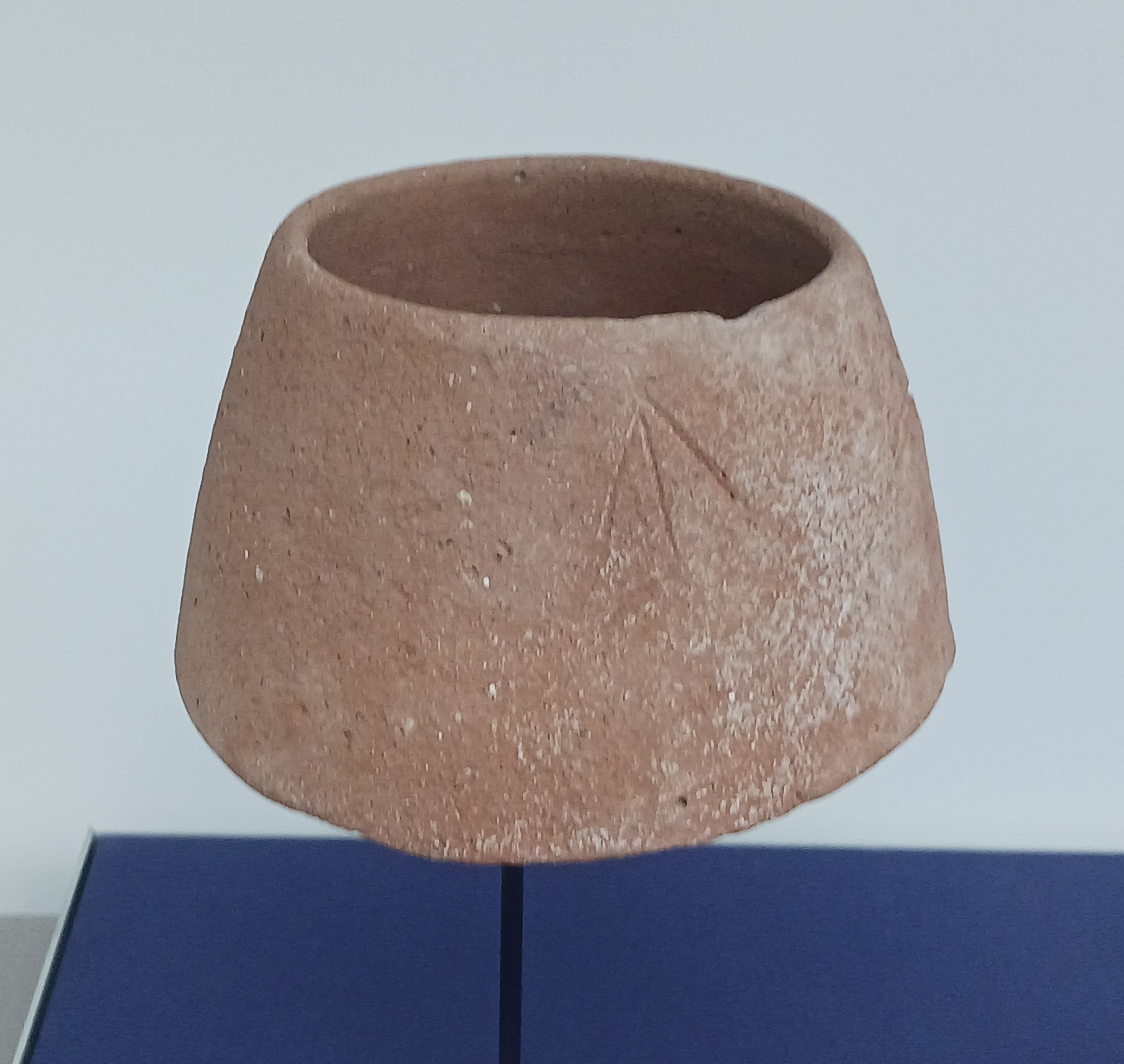
Clayton ring. Bir Sahara BS-21, Early Dynastic period, A-Group culture, circa 2900 BCE. British Museum EA 76814.

A very typical object type found are small stone rings, called Clayton rings. The Rings are found spread over a vast area in the Al Dakhla Desert. The rings were made during Egypt's first dynasties (c. 3100–2600BC), that is the Early Bronze Age. Their function is unknown. The rings are named after the explorer Pat Clayton.

== Egyptian intrusion ==
From the middle 3rd millennium BCE onwards the oases occupied by the Sheikh Muftah culture came under Egyptian control. It seems that Egyptians and people of the Sheikh Muftah culture lived close by each other: Some Sheikh Muftah culture sites are found very close to Egyptian settlements.

== See also ==
- Dakhla Oasis
- Kharga Oasis
