= Temple of Hibis =

Ancient Egyptian temple in Kharga Oasis, New Valley Governorate, Egypt

Coordinates: 25°28′37″N 30°33′22″E

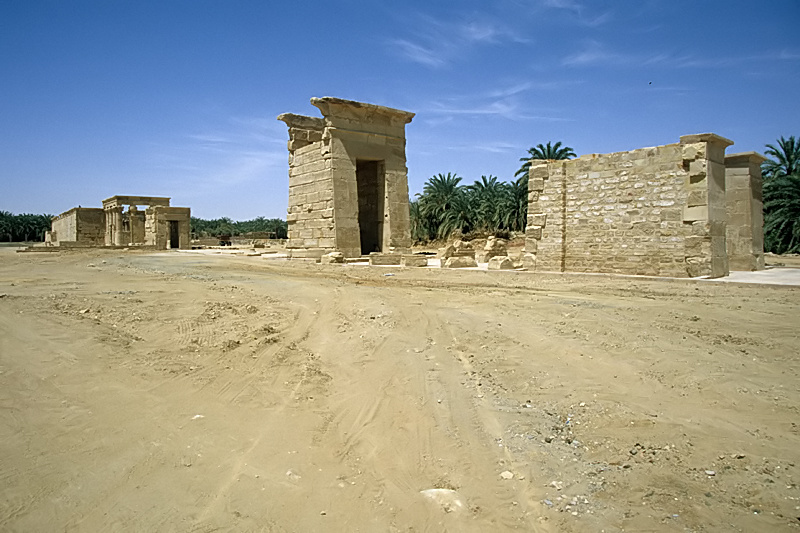
The hallway with pylons, leading to the hypostyle hall

The Temple of Hibis is the largest and best preserved ancient Egyptian temple in the Kharga Oasis, as well as the only structure in Egypt dating to the Saite-Persian period (664–404 BCE) which has come down to modern times in relatively good condition. Located about 2 km north of Kharga, it was devoted to a syncretism of two local forms of the deity Amun: "Amun of Hibis" and "Amun-Ra of Karnak who dwells in Hibis".

It is alternatively believed to be dedicated to Amun and Osiris, its sanctuary contains depictions of hundreds of Egyptian deities.

== History ==
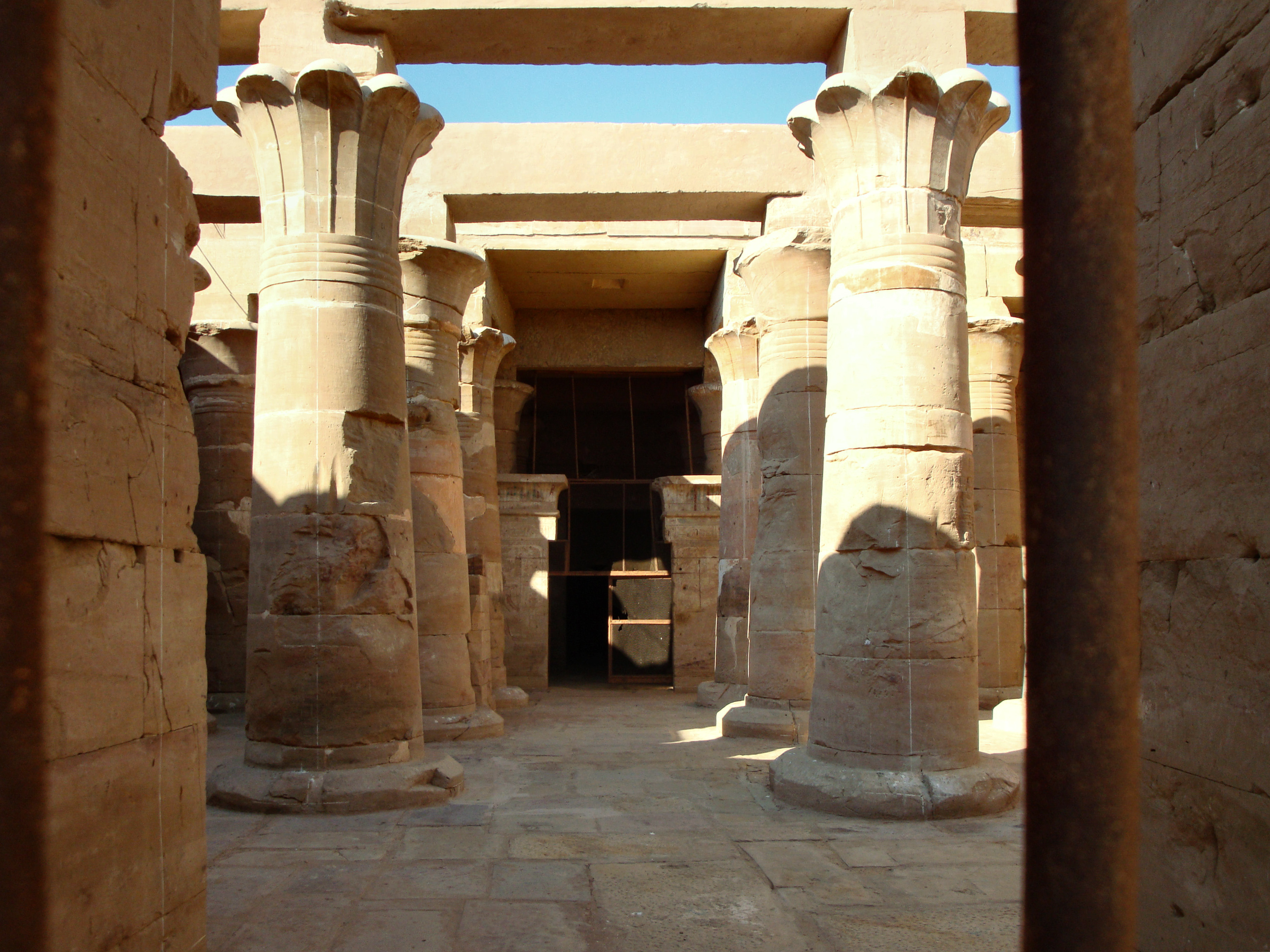
Palmiform columns at the Temple of Hibis

h b hb t niwt
hb(t)
"The City of the Plough"
in hieroglyphs
Era: Late Period
(664–332 BC)

The temple of Hibis was once surrounded by the city of Hibis (Egyptian: Hebet, meaning "the plough"), which nowadays lies under the crops. Construction of the temple started during the 26th Dynasty, most likely under Pharaoh Psamtik II, or possibly even earlier, during the 25th Dynasty. Archaeological evidences suggest that an older temple, dating back to the New Kingdom, was already present in the same place. Several decades after Psamtik II, during the 27th Dynasty, the Achaemenid pharaoh Darius I took a particularly active part in its building, being credited with the decoration of the walls. Later, several other rulers made additions or decorations here, such as Hakor of the 29th Dynasty, notably Nectanebo I and Nectanebo II of the 30th Dynasty, possibly Ptolemy IV (Ptolemaic Dynasty), and at least one Roman emperor.

A first excavation campaign, organized by the Metropolitan Museum of Art of New York, took place in 1909–11. A more recent one, led by Eugene Cruz-Uribe, began in 1985.

== Description ==
The temple bears a close resemblance – both architecturally and regarding inscribed texts – to Theban temples of the New Kingdom and also of the Ptolemaic period, yet it differs from both because of some peculiarities, such as the rather bold style of the decorations.

A long hallway, lined with sphinxes, crosses a series of pylons and arrives to the proper temple. This was originally surrounded by a lake, now long-gone. The hypostyle hall has its walls shaped like huge papyrus rolls, bearing various decorations and several hymns dedicated to the deity Amun, many of which are known since earlier times. Among the decorations, notable is a depiction of Seth defeating Apep, a theme believed by some art historians to be a foreshadowing of Saint George and the Dragon.

The walls and the roof are dedicated to the Theban theology and to Osiris respectively, while the naos is subdivided in nine registers, fully decorated with a pantheon of Egyptian deity and royal figures, for a total of almost 700 figures. At the beginning of each register, the king is depicted while performing a ritual; the Egyptian nomoi are also present, each one represented in an Osirian form. In stark contrast with the richness of these representations, the accompanying inscriptions are brief, when not absent at all.

The relatively good preservation of the Temple of Hibis may be attributed to its seclusion. However, since several decades the building is endangered by a rise of ground water which is damaging its foundations, and the Egyptian Antiquities Service was taking into consideration a complete dismantling and relocation of the whole temple.

== See also ==
- List of ancient Egyptian sites, including sites of temples
