= Kharga Oasis =

Oasis in Egypt

Kharga ϯⲟⲩⲁϩ ⲛ̀ϩⲏⲃ, ϯⲟⲩⲁϩ ⲙ̀ⲯⲟⲓ
- Town
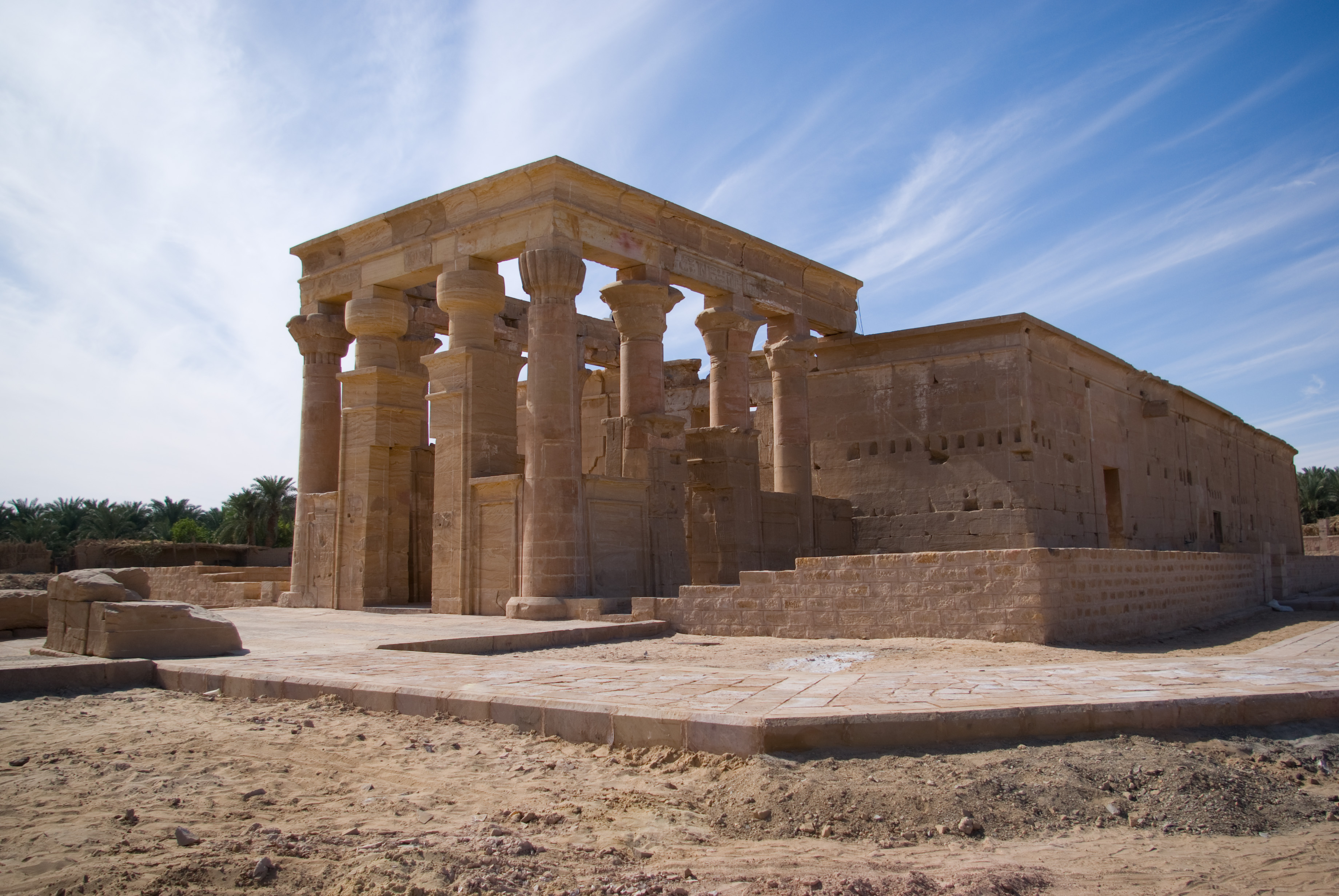
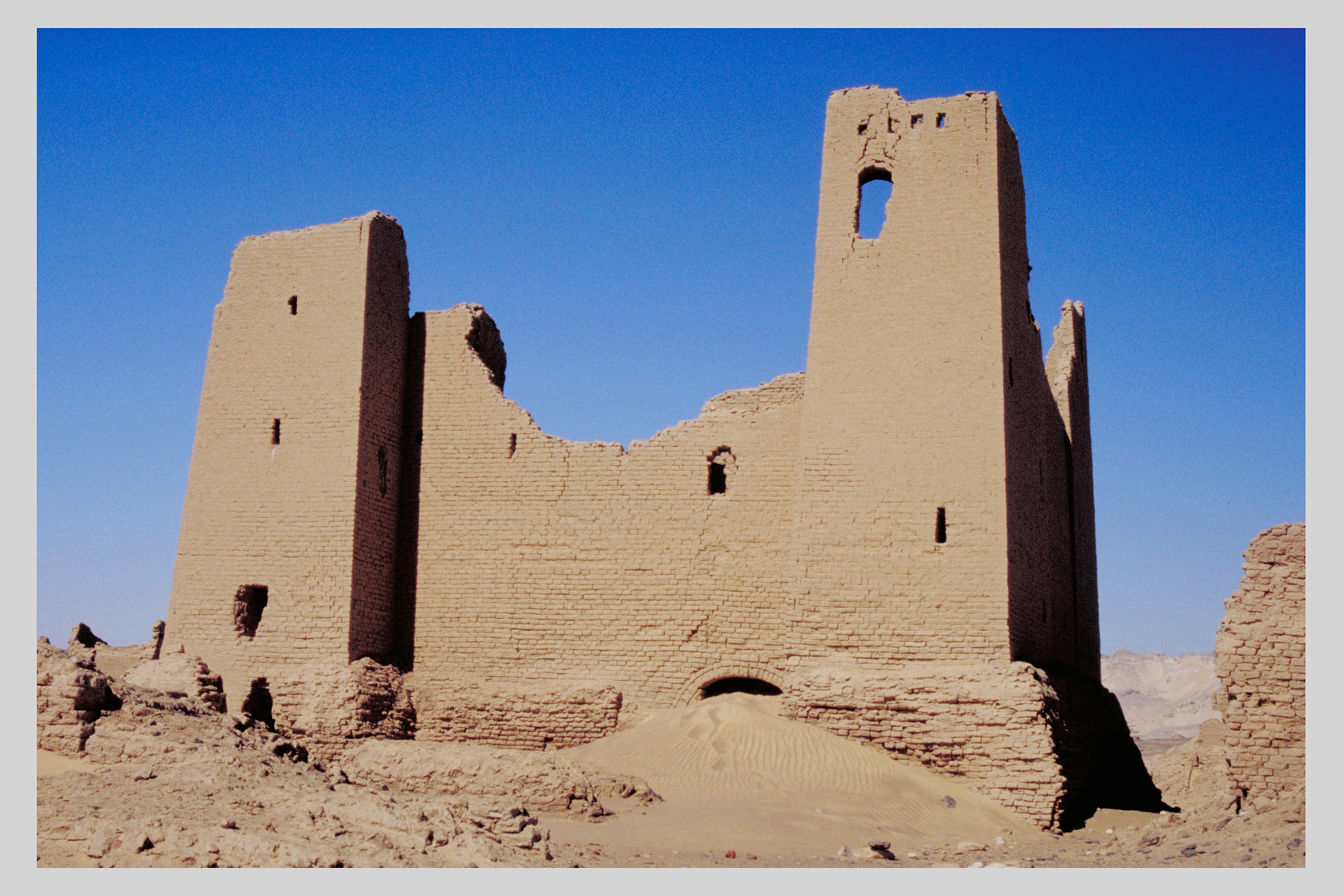
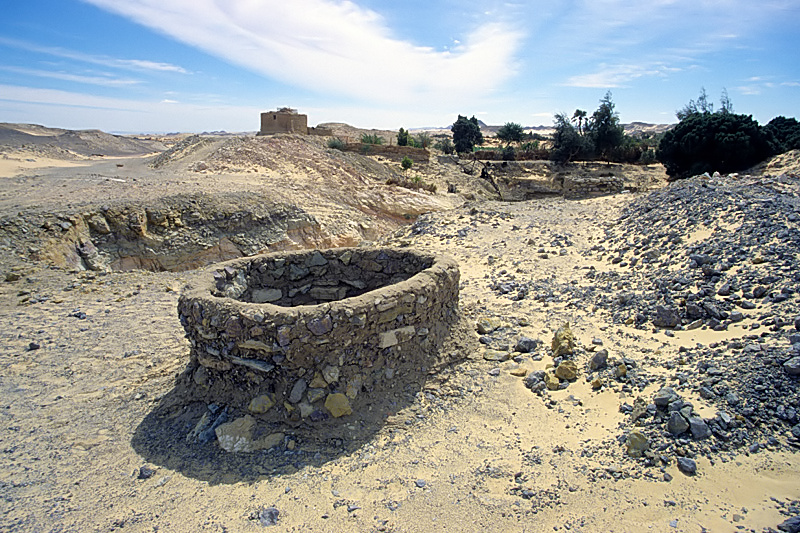
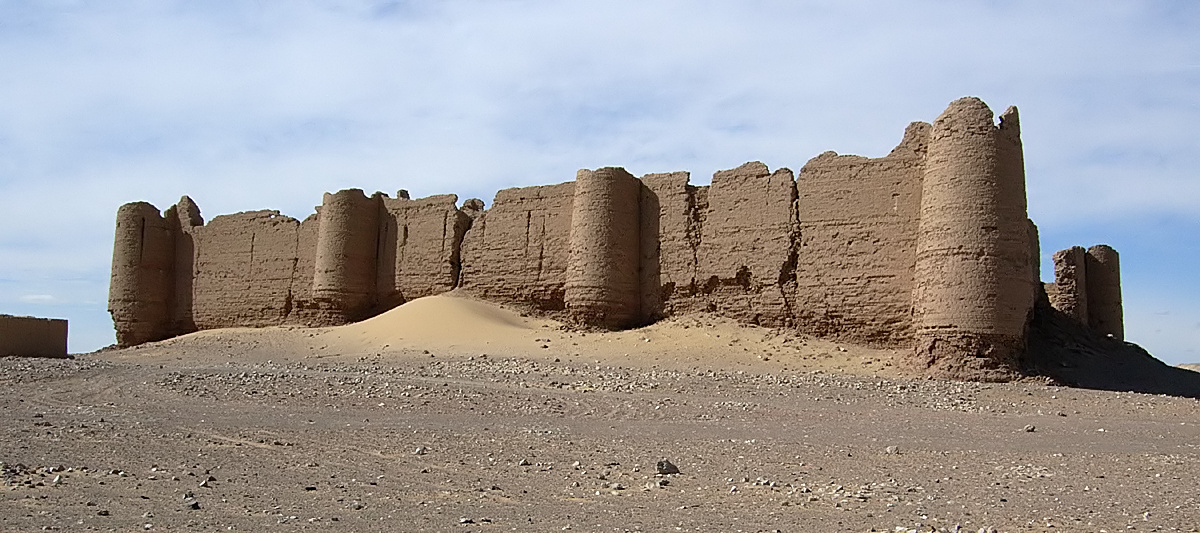
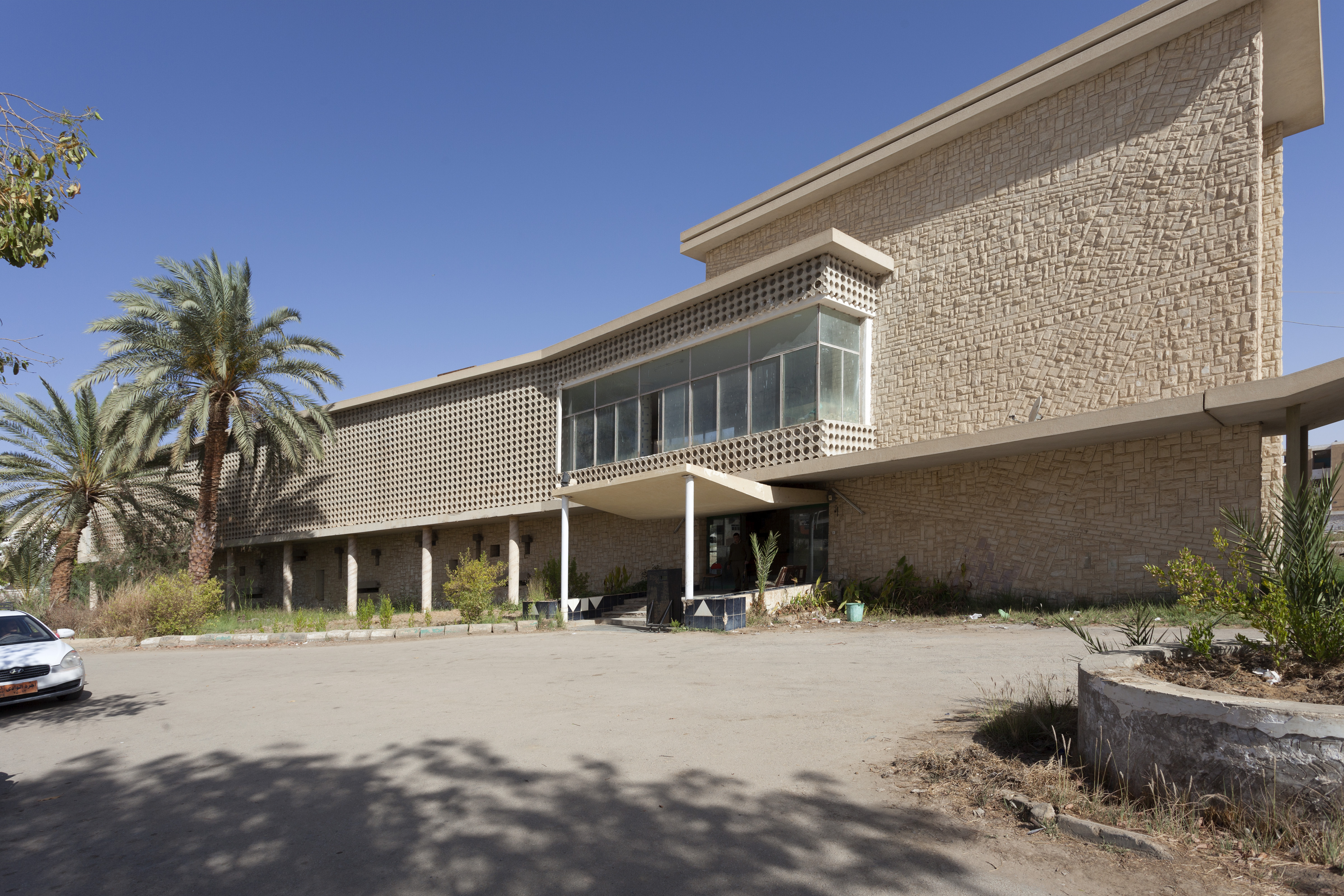
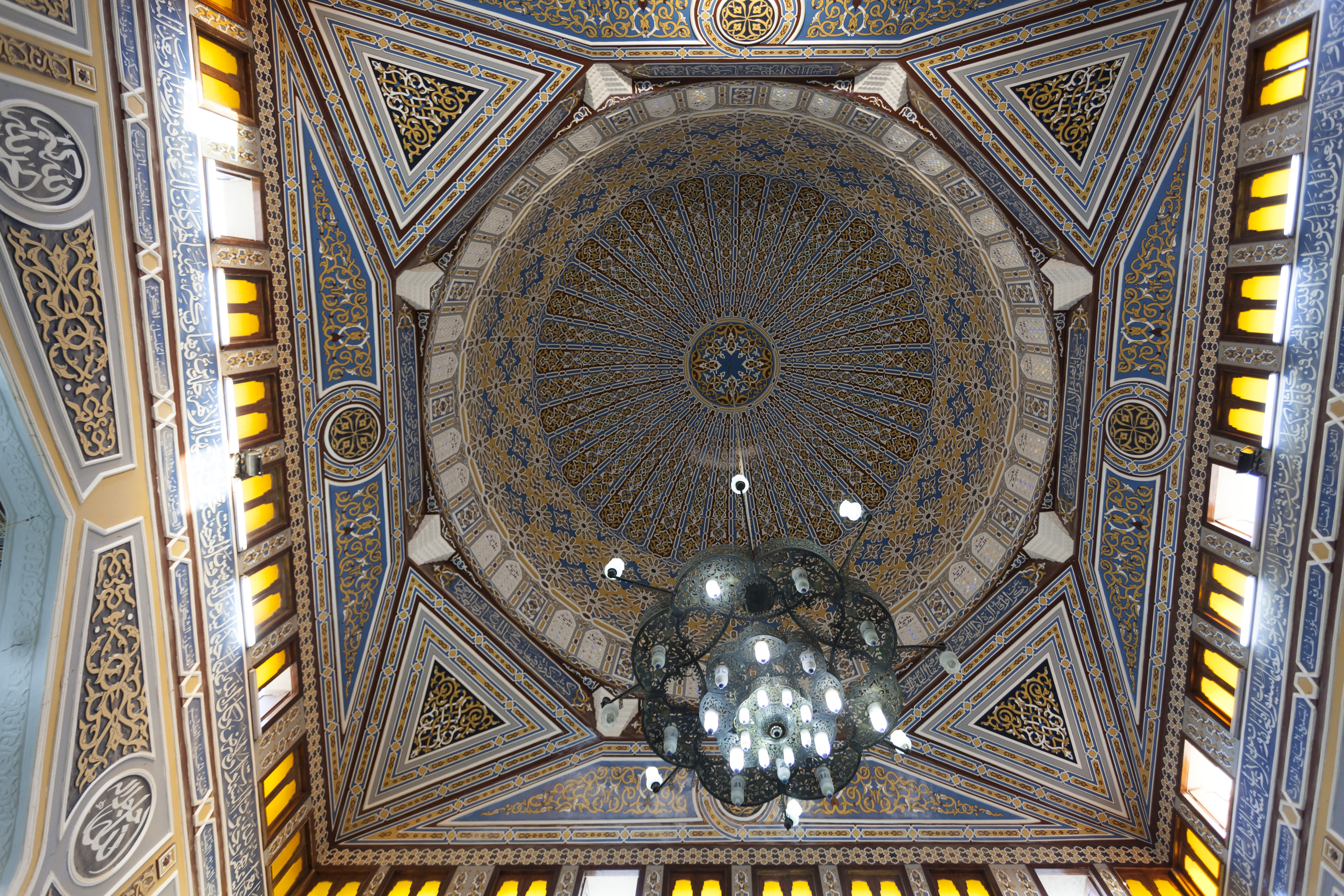
- Clockwise from top: Temple of Hibis, qanat shaft near Qasr al-Labakha fortress, Deir al-Munira fortress, Umm al-Dabadib fortress, Kharga Rest-house, Kharga Mosque

- Location in Egypt
- Coordinates: 25°26′56″N 30°32′24″E
- Country: Egypt
- Governorate: New Valley

Area
  - Total: 1,017 km^{2} (393 sq mi)
- Elevation: 32 m (105 ft)

Population (2023)
  - Total: 87,482
  - Density: 86.02/km^{2} (222.8/sq mi)
- Time zone: UTC+2 (EET)
  - Summer (DST): UTC+3 (EEST)

The Kharga Oasis (Arabic: الخارجة al-Ḫāriǧa, pronounced [elˈxæɾɡæ]) lit. 'the outer'; Coptic: (ϯ)ⲟⲩⲁϩ ⲛ̀ϩⲏⲃ (di)wah enhib, "Oasis of Hib", (ϯ)ⲟⲩⲁϩ ⲙ̀ⲯⲟⲓ (di)wah empsoi "Oasis of Psoi") is the southernmost of Egypt's five western oases. It is located in the Western Desert, about 200 km (125 miles) to the west of the Nile valley. "Kharga" or "El Kharga" is also the name of a major town located in the oasis, the capital of New Valley Governorate.

The oasis, which was known as the 'Southern Oasis' to the Ancient Egyptians, the 'outer' (he Exotero) to the Greeks and Oasis Magna to the Romans, is the largest of the oases in the Libyan Desert of Egypt. It is in a depression about 160 km (100 miles) long and between 20 km (12 miles) and 80 km (50 miles) wide. The Oasis's estimated population is 87,482 as of 2023.

== Overview ==
k n T35 m t niwt
knm(t)
"The Vineyard"
in hieroglyphs
Era: New Kingdom
(1550–1069 BC)

Aa2 t Z1 T14 xAst niwt rsw N21 Z1 b xAst niwt
wḥꜣt rswt ḥb
"The Southern Oasis of Hibis"
in hieroglyphs

Kharga is the most modernised of Egypt's western oases. The main town is highly functional with all modern facilities, and virtually nothing left of the old architecture. There is extensive thorny date palm, acacia, buffalo thorn, and jujube growth in the oasis surrounding the modern town of Kharga. Many remnant wildlife species inhabit this region.

== Climate ==
The Köppen-Geiger climate classification system classifies its climate as hot desert (BWh). Kharga Oasis experiences extreme summers for most of the year with no precipitation and warm winters with cool nights.

Climate data for Kharga (2000–2020)
| Month | Jan | Feb | Mar | Apr | May | Jun | Jul | Aug | Sep | Oct | Nov | Dec | Year |
|---|---|---|---|---|---|---|---|---|---|---|---|---|---|
| Record high °C (°F) | 36.0 (96.8) | 42.3 (108.1) | 47.5 (117.5) | 46.4 (115.5) | 49.8 (121.6) | 50.3 (122.5) | 47.5 (117.5) | 46.8 (116.2) | 45.4 (113.7) | 44.6 (112.3) | 39.8 (103.6) | 38.7 (101.7) | 50.3 (122.5) |
| Mean daily maximum °C (°F) | 22.6 (72.7) | 25.2 (77.4) | 29.6 (85.3) | 34.5 (94.1) | 38.5 (101.3) | 40.6 (105.1) | 41.2 (106.2) | 41.2 (106.2) | 38.8 (101.8) | 34.6 (94.3) | 28.9 (84.0) | 24.1 (75.4) | 33.3 (92.0) |
| Mean daily minimum °C (°F) | 7.0 (44.6) | 9.1 (48.4) | 12.7 (54.9) | 17.5 (63.5) | 22.0 (71.6) | 24.7 (76.5) | 25.0 (77.0) | 25.2 (77.4) | 23.8 (74.8) | 20.2 (68.4) | 13.9 (57.0) | 9.2 (48.6) | 17.5 (63.6) |
| Record low °C (°F) | 0.0 (32.0) | 0.2 (32.4) | 2.6 (36.7) | 6.4 (43.5) | 10.6 (51.1) | 14.8 (58.6) | 16.9 (62.4) | 16.9 (62.4) | 14.9 (58.8) | 9.9 (49.8) | 0.8 (33.4) | 0.8 (33.4) | 0.0 (32.0) |
| Average precipitation mm (inches) | 0.1 (0.00) | 0 (0) | 0.1 (0.00) | 0 (0) | 0.1 (0.00) | 0 (0) | 0 (0) | 0 (0) | 0 (0) | 0 (0) | 0 (0) | 0 (0) | 0.3 (0) |
| Average precipitation days | 0 | 0 | 0.1 | 0 | 0 | 0 | 0 | 0 | 0 | 0 | 0 | 0 | 0.1 |
| Average relative humidity (%) | 52 | 45 | 38 | 29 | 27 | 28 | 30 | 31 | 36 | 41 | 47 | 51 | 37.9 |
| Mean monthly sunshine hours | 287.8 | 274.4 | 297.8 | 307.2 | 336.8 | 361.6 | 359.9 | 364.9 | 321.1 | 313.0 | 289.7 | 276.6 | 3,790.8 |
Source 1: Meteomanz
Source 2: NOAA

== Darb El Arba'īn caravan route ==
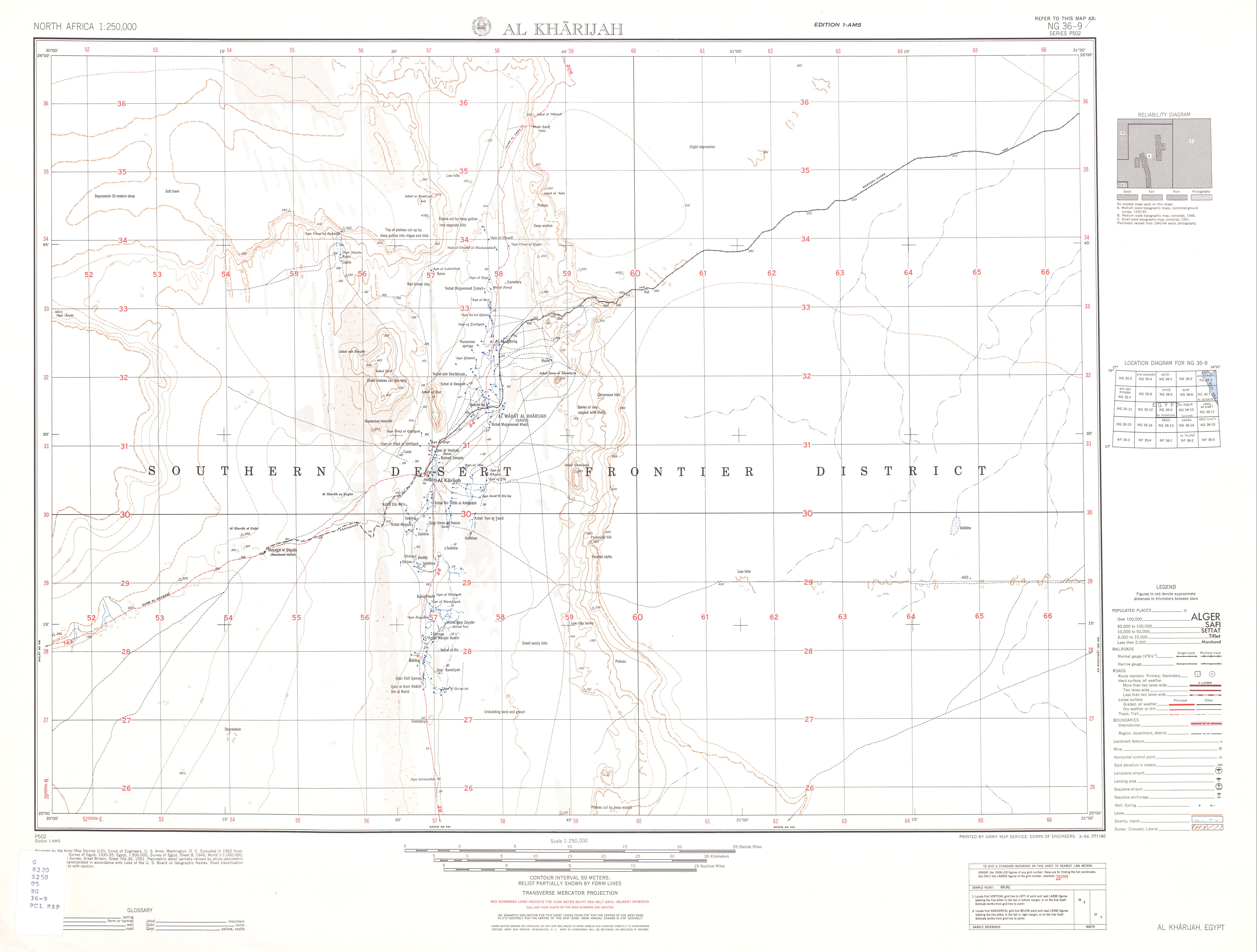
Map sheet showing Kharga Oasis.

A trade route called Darb El Arba'īn ("the Way of Forty") passed through Kharga as part of a long caravan route running north–south between Middle Egypt and the Sudan. The ancient route connected the Al-Fashir area of Sudan to Asyut in Egypt, navigating through a chain of oases including Kharga, Selima Oasis and Bir Natrun.

At least 700 years old, it was likely used from as early as the Old Kingdom of Egypt for the transport and trade of gold, ivory, spices, wheat, animals and plants.

The maximum extent of Darb El Arba'īn was northward from Kobbei in Darfur (located about 40 kilometres (25 mi) north of al-Fashir) passing through the desert, through Bir Natrum and Wadi Howar, and ending at the Nile River access point of Asyut in Egypt. This is a journey of approximately 1,800 km (1,100 mi). The desert route was less expensive and safer than the more visually appealing Nile route.

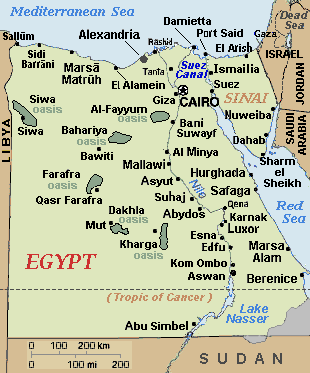
Site of the Kharga Oasis in Egypt (lower centre).

All the oases have always been crossroads of caravan routes converging from the barren desert. In the case of Kharga, this is made particularly evident by the presence of a chain of fortresses that the Romans built to protect the Darb El Arba'īn route. The forts vary in size and function, some being just small outposts, some guarding large settlements complete with cultivation. Some were installed where earlier settlements already existed, while others were probably started from scratch. All of them are made of mud bricks, but some also contain small stone temples with inscriptions on the walls.

Described by Herodotus as a road "traversed…in forty days," by his time the route had already become an important land route facilitating trade between Nubia and Egypt. The length of the journey is the reason for it being called Darb El Arba`īn, the implication being "the forty-day road".

After the prominent Christian theologian Nestorius was condemned as a heretic in the 431 Council of Ephesus, he was removed from his position as Patriarch of Constantinople and exiled to a monastery then located in the Great Oasis of Hibis (El Kharga). There he lived for the rest of his life. The monastery suffered attacks by desert bandits, and Nestorius was injured in one such raid. Nestorius seems to have survived there until at least 450 and there composed the Bazaar of Heracleides—the only one of his writings to survive in full, and of importance to the Christian Nestorians who follow his teachings.

As part of a caravan proceeding to Darfur, the English explorer W.G. Browne paused for several days at Kharga, leaving with the rest of the group on 7 June 1793. At the time, a gindi (a Turkish horseman, that performs extraordinary feats) was stationed at Kharga, "belonging to Ibrahim Bey El Kebir, to whom those villages appertain; and to [this official] is entrusted the management of what relates to the caravan during the time of its stay there."

In 1930 the archaeologist, Gertrude Caton–Thompson, uncovered the palaeolithic history of Kharga.

== Demographics ==
In his diary, “Al-Hajj Al-Bari” mentioned the most important families descending from Christians and Romans in the Kharga Oasis. They are the families of “Al-Jawiya, the families of Al-Tawayh, the Al-Bahramah family, the Al-Sanadiyah family, the Al-Azayza family, the Al-Badayrah family, the Al-Mahbasiya family, the Al-Hosnieh family, and the Al-Na’imah family And the Al-Sharayra family, and there are Nubian families in the village of Baris. There are few Berber families too who are thought to be the indigenous people of Kharga but the majority today are Arab families.

Perhaps the most important of these Arab families that came to the Khargha Oasis from the beginning of the year 300 AH are the families of the Idris from Tunisia or Libya, the family of Rekabia and the family of the jewehera from the Hijaz and the family of shakawera and the family of Al-Radawana and the family from the Arabs of Mecca and the family of Al-Shawami from the Levant and there are families from the countries of the Egyptian country such as Dabatiya and Asawiya from Assiut Or Sohag and the Awlad-el-sheikh from Egypt “It is more likely to mean Cairo”, the family of Njarin from Qalamoun in Dakhla, the family of Al Shaabna from Mallawi, the family of Al-Awamir from Al-Amayem tribe and the family of Al-Alawneh from Al-Alawiya in addition to Turkish families such as Al-Dabashiya, Al-Tarakah Al-Kharja and the Bash families The Qaqamqam, Askari, Tannabur, Qitas, and Kashif.

== Transportation ==
A regular bus service connects the oasis to the other Western oases and to the rest of Egypt. In 1907, the narrow gauge Western Oasis Lines provided twice-weekly train services. A standard gauge railway line Kharga → Qena (Nile Valley) → Port Safaga (Red Sea) has been in service since 1996, but was decommissioned soon after.

== Archaeological sites ==
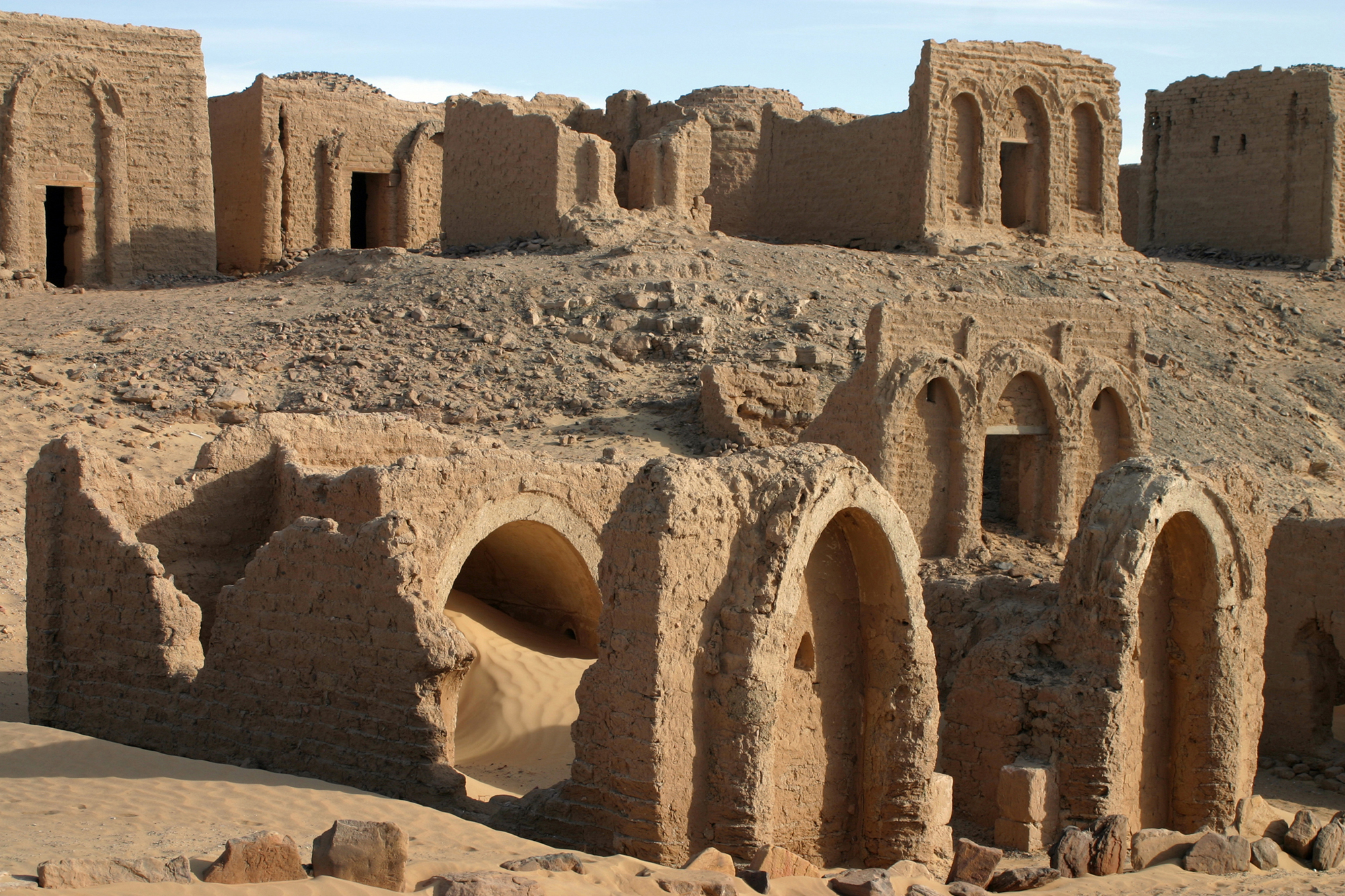
The El Bagawat Christian cemetery at Kharga Oasis

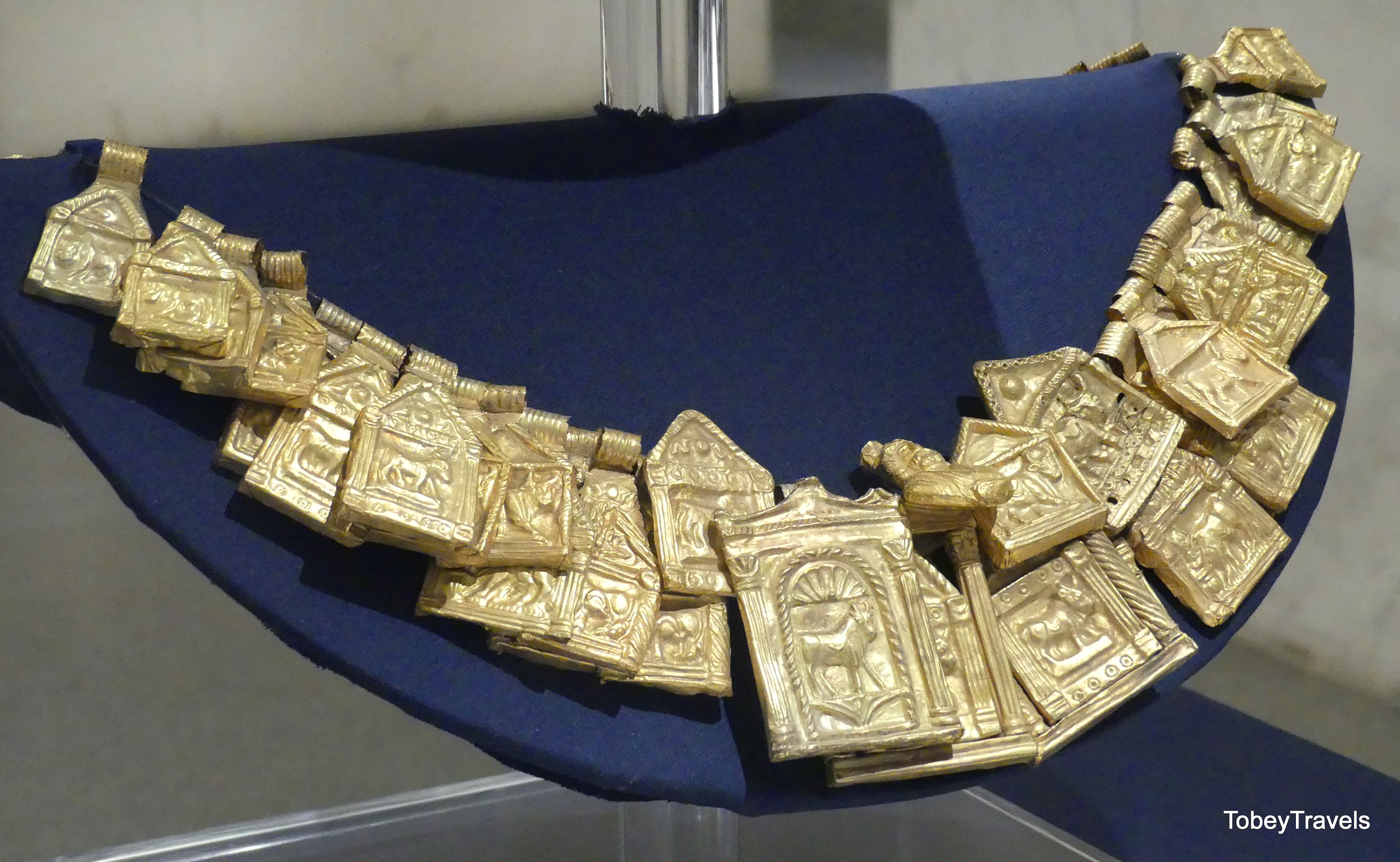
A Necklace from the Treasure of Dush found in the Kharga Oasis site of Dush, Egypt.

The Temple of Hibis is a Saite-era temple founded by Psamtik II, which was erected largely c. 500 BC. It is located about 2 kilometres north of modern Kharga, in a palm-grove. There is a second 1st millennium BC temple in the southernmost part of the oasis at Dush. An ancient Christian cemetery at El Bagawat also functioned at the Kharga Oasis from the 3rd to the 7th century AD. It is one of the earliest and best preserved Christian cemeteries in the ancient world.

The first list of sites is due to Ahmad Fakhri but serious archaeological work began in 1976 with Serge Sauneron, director of the Institut Français d'Archéologie Orientale.

Sites

- Ain El Beleida (Roman)
- Ain El Labakha (Roman)
- Ain Manawir (Persian, Roman)
- Ain Shams El Din (Coptic church)
- Ain El Tarakwa (Roman)
- Ain Tauleib (Roman)
- Deir Mustafa Kashef (Coptic monastery)
- Deir El Munira (Roman)
- Dush, Egypt (Ptolemaic and Roman)
- Gabbanat El Bagawat (Coptic cemetery)
- Gebel El Teir (Prehistoric times)
- El Nadura (Roman)
- Qasr El Dabashiya (Roman)
- Qasr Dush (Greco-Roman)
- Qasr El Ghuweita (Late Period)
- Qasr El Gibb (Roman)
- Qasr El Zayyan (Greco-Roman)
- Sumeira (Roman)
- Temple of Hibis (Persian - c. 6th century BC.)
- Umm El Dabadib (Roman)
- Umm Mawagir (Middle Kingdom, 2nd Intermediate Period)

=== Meteorite dagger ===
In June 2016, a report emerged that attributed the dagger buried with Pharaoh Tutankhamun to an iron meteorite, with similar proportions of metals (iron, nickel and cobalt) to one discovered near and named after Kharga Oasis. The dagger's metal was presumably from the same meteor shower.

== See also ==
- List of cities in Egypt
- Temple of Hibis
