= Western Oasis Lines =

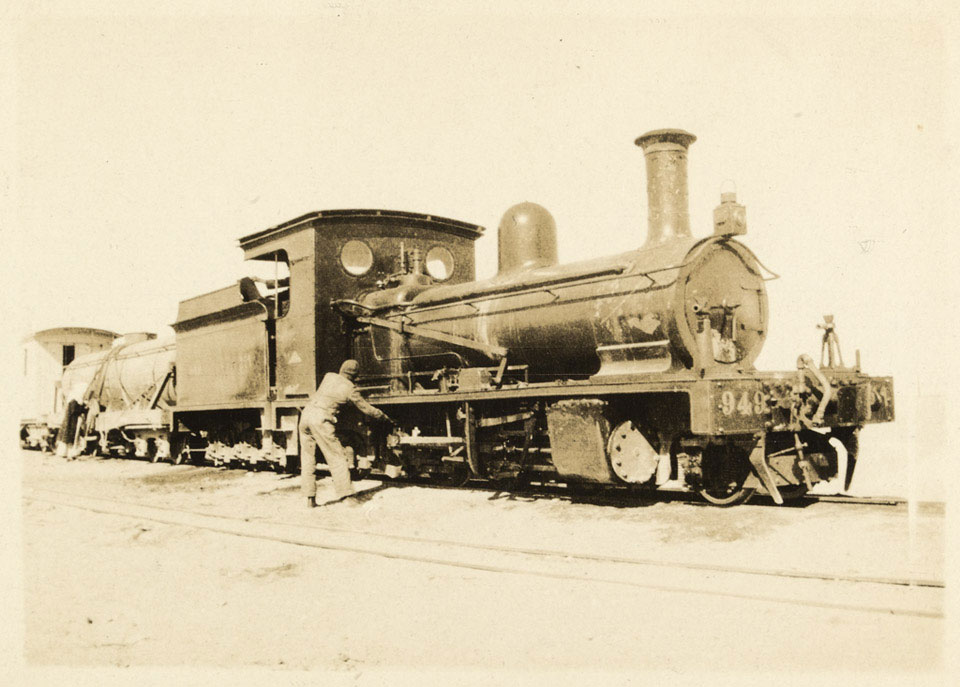
- Western Oases Railway, 1917

Technical
- Line length: 125 miles (200 km)
- Track gauge: 2 feet 6 inch (762 mm)

The Western Oasis Lines or Western Oasis Railway (W.O.R.) built and operated a 125 miles (200 km) long narrow gauge railway with a gauge of 2 feet 6 inch (762 mm) in Egypt.

== History ==
The railway line was constructed under the supervision of Major Burton, who had been the surveyor of the Haifa-Baghdad railway. It was laid at a rate of 5½ miles per day (9 km per day), and was inaugurated in 1907. It went from Oasis Junction to Kharga Oasis. Initially, there were two trains per week in either direction. They had an observation car and a saloon car with leather covered seats and windows tinted in blue. One or several locomotives were supplied by Nasmyth, Wilson & Co. in the time from 1922 to 1937.

From 1974 to 1989, a new 375 miles (680 km) long standard gauge railway line was built from Safaga at the Red Sea via Qena to Kharga Oasis. In and around Kharga are the underground Tartour mines, in which phosphates were planned to be mined. However, the world-price for phosphates had dropped so much during the unusually long construction period that mining was not profitable anymore, after the line had been opened.

== Literature ==
- A.E. Durrant, A.A. Jorgensen und C.P. Lewis: Steam in Africa. Hamlyn, London 1981.
