= Dush, Egypt =

Coordinates: 24.5784305°N 30.715438°E

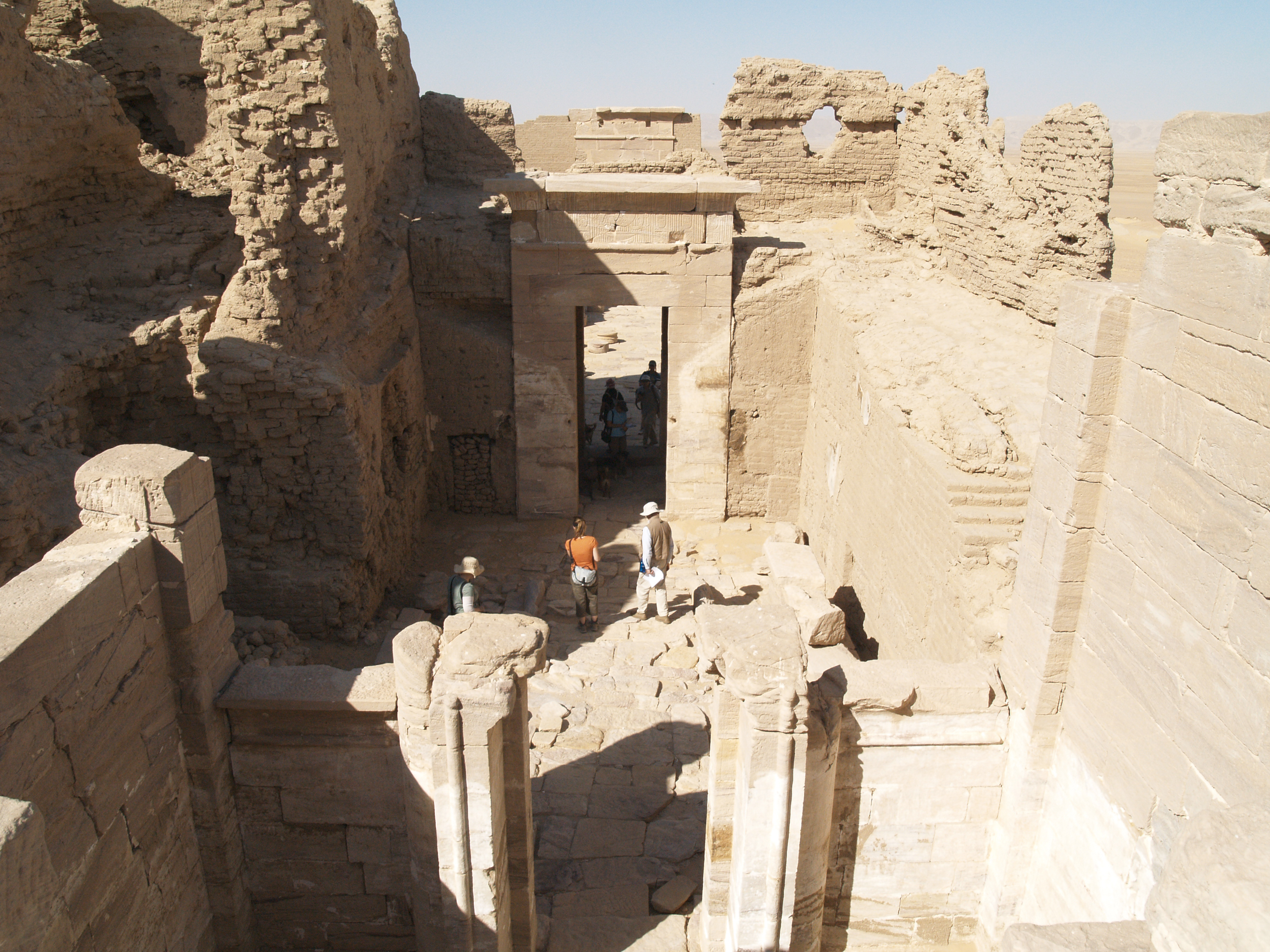
Interior of the Temple of Dush

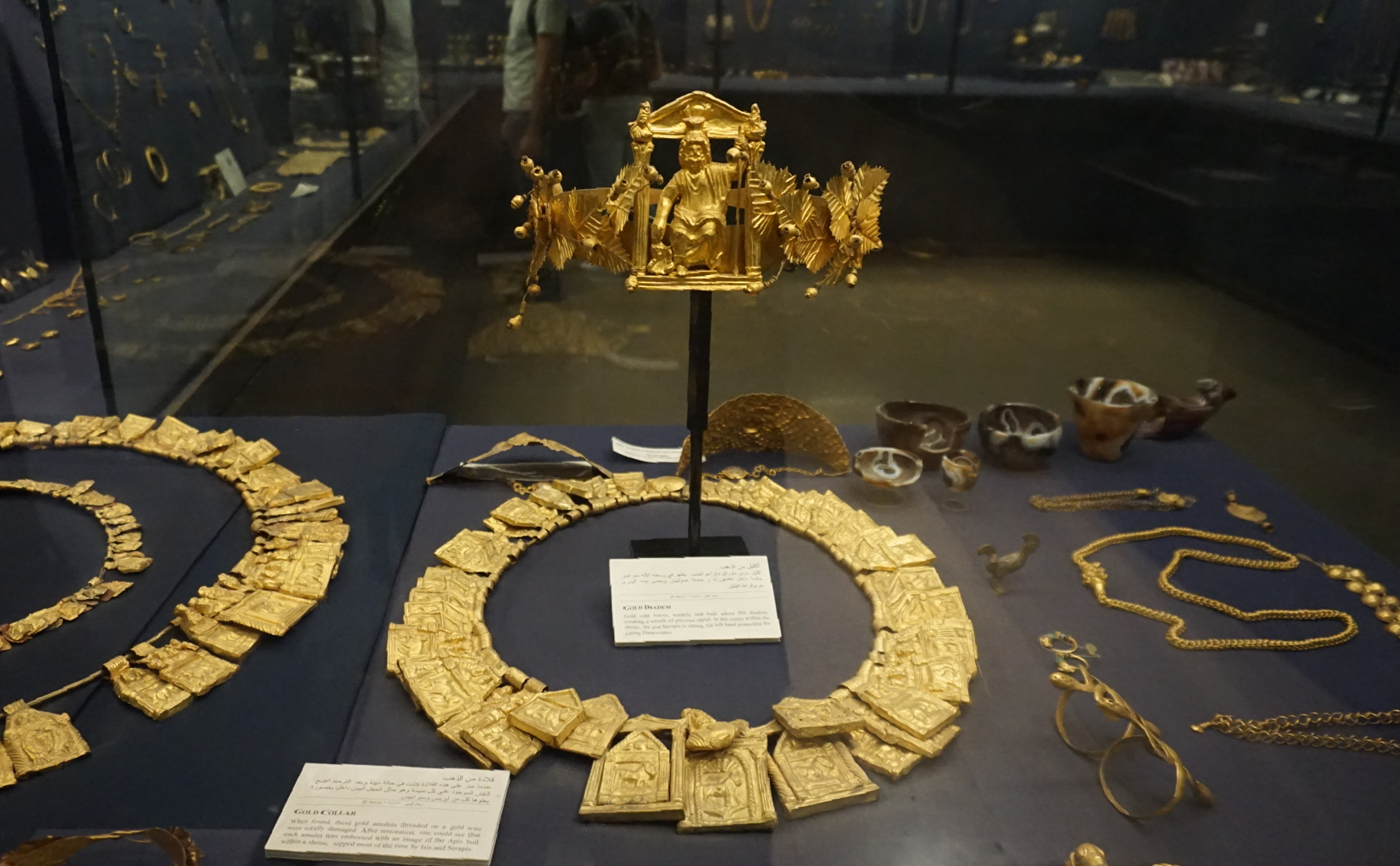
The Treasure of Dush with the god Serapis on top and a beaten gold collar below displayed at the Egyptian Museum.

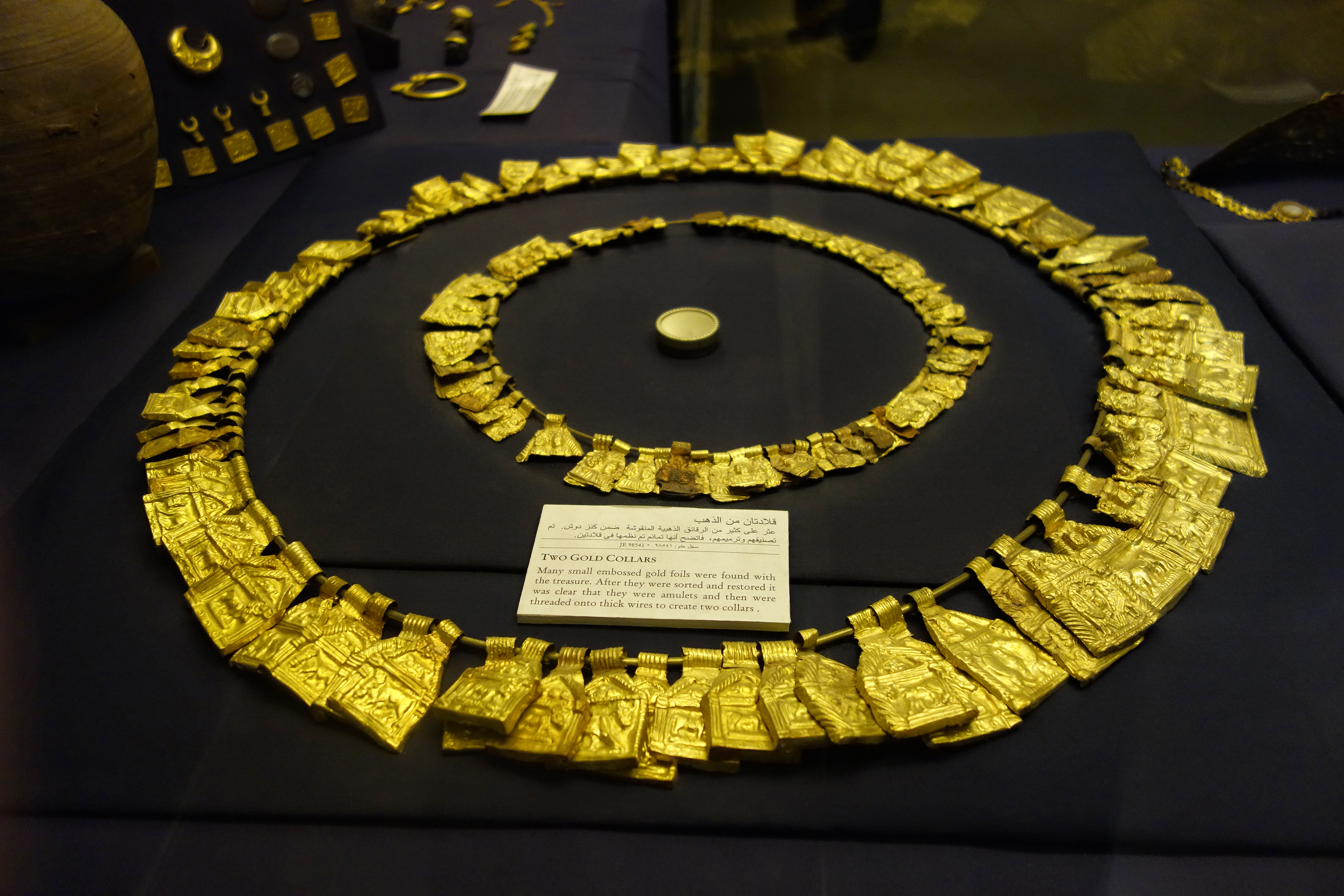
Two sets of Gold Collars from the Treasure of Dush.

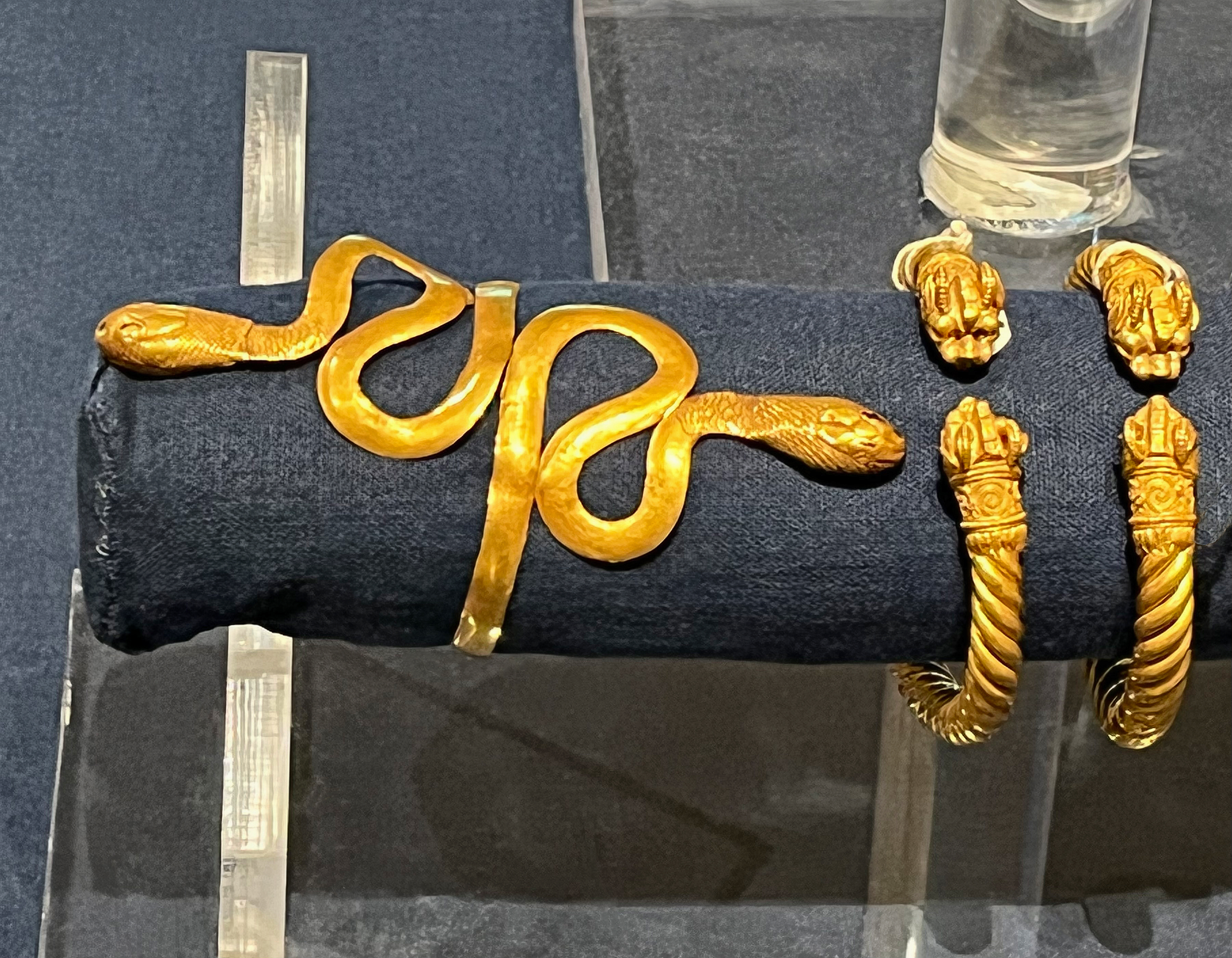
Two Lion shaped Gold bracellets from the Treasure of Dush.

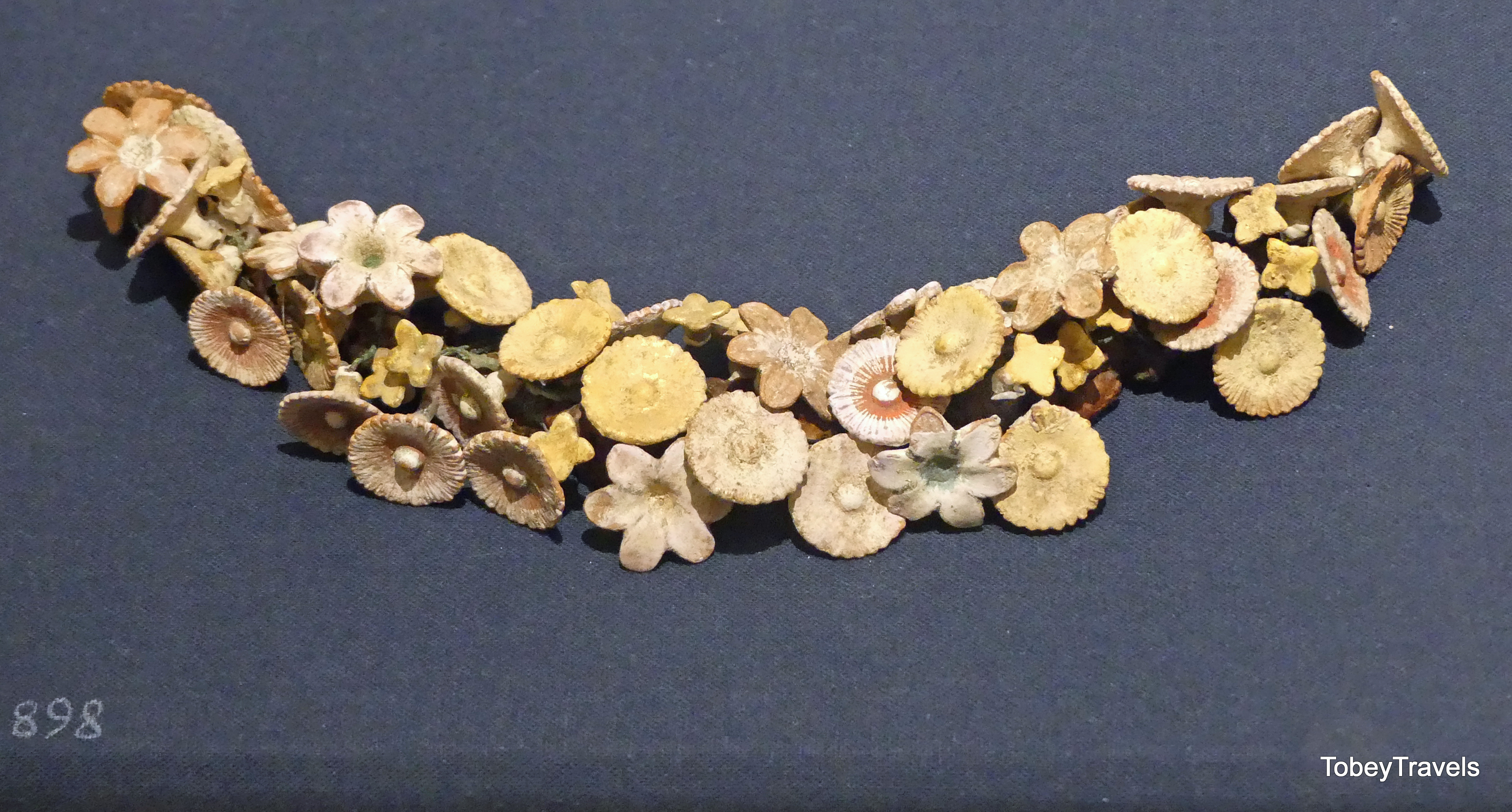
Flower shaped clay objects from the Treasure of Dush.

Dush, Egypt, or (Douch in French) formerly known as Kysis, is a small Ptolemaic and Roman era fortress located in Egypt's vast Western Desert in the Kharga Oasis. which was built under the Ptolemies and then under the Roman Emperors Domitian, Trajan and Hadrian. Dush is strategically located "about 15 km northeast of El-Qasr, at a convergence of five ancient desert tracks. One of these tracks, "the Darb el-Dush, linked this outpost directly to the Nile valley towns of Esna and Edfu, marking it as a critical route in Roman times." According to Cassandra Vivian: "today thousands upon thousands of potsherds cover the site and two sandstone temples and several cemeteries have been excavated by IFAO, whose dig house is at the base of the hill....From papyri found in the area, dated to the third century, and archaeological evidence it is apparent that the site was of great importance."

Dush is the site of a sandstone temple with a colonnade originally dedicated to Osiris, who the Greeks transformed into Serapis, and also to the goddess Isis. The Dush "fortress stands atop the highest hill in the area, about 2 kilometres (1.2 miles) northeast of the modern village of Dush. It is 79 meters (253 ft) above sea level. The oldest building found so far on this site, the fortress dates from the Ptolemaic era." The Sandstone Temple of Osiris here was initially built by Domitian, with a court erected by Trajan and other temple portions added by Hadrian. While few decorations survive, parts of the temple "are believed to have been covered in gold. The temple includes several areas, including two courts, a small hypostyle hall with only four columns, and a sanctuary.....Numerous artifacts have been unearthed in and around the temple area, including pottery, coins, ostraca, and jewelry."

== Dush cemetery ==
Ancient cemeteries surround the town of Dush on its north and west sides. By 1998, the Institut Français d'Archéologie Orientale or IFAO "had found ninety-two tombs and nearly 433 individual burials in the Dush cemeteries. They discovered that 16 percent of the men and 19 percent of the women had died between twenty-one and forty years of age, while 30 percent of the men and 19 percent of the women died between forty and fifty-nine, and 5.6 percent of the men and 10 percent of the women lived beyond the age of sixty."

== Treasure of Dush ==
A French archaeological team from Institut Français d'Archéologie Orientale or (IFAO) has been excavating at Dush since 1976. In 1989, they discovered the "Dush or (Douch) Treasure" which consisted of several sets "of magnificent gold necklaces, crowns and coins dating back to the second century" in one of the magazine complexes at Dush. Nearby, the treasure had been concealed in pottery jars and covered by masonry. In 2005, Zahi Hawass, Egypt's former Minister of Tourism and Antiquities announced that: "These golden treasures [from Dush] will be the first of many other exhibits in the Egyptian Museum that will be 'excavated' from its [the Museum's] corridors and halls and put on display with various educational tools explaining their significance" as part of the display 'The Golden Jewelry of Dush'. The Dush or Douch treasure reportedly:

....consists of a gold Diadem, two bracelets, and a necklace of 187 gold plates...[and was]...compressed into a large case hidden in the wall of a Roman fort, not far from a temple dedicated to Serapis and Isis. It weighs 363 grams and was discovered in the Kharga Oasis, Egypt...and dates from the 2nd Century AD [in the Roman period of Egypt]. The diadem is decorated with vine leaves and branches within a temple facade, his right hand is on the head of the god Harpocrates. Busts of the god Isis are surmounting the two columns and coming out of the two rosettes, ending the decoration on both sides. The same vine leaves and branches are seen around an agate stone "orange" on the bracelet, and a piece of glass paste "green" on the other side.

Francesco Tiradritti, in a 1999 book, states that the Dush Treasure with the God Serapis and the beaten gold collar directly below it, as well as the Orange Agate Stone medallion, dates to the reign of Hadrian (117-138 AD). He also writes:

" Even though the [Dush] treasure was found in an area outside the actual temple [of Dush], it is probable that it once belonged to the temple and was hidden, perhaps following the spread of Christianity and the decline of pagan cults in the fourth and fifth centuries AD."

This would mean that the Treasure of Dush was not discovered by looters, then hidden away in a magazine complex and subsequently lost due to the movement of desert sands as the Egyptian authorities once thought.

The Treasure of Dush was moved from the old Egyptian Museum to the newer National Museum of Egyptian Civilization (NMEC) by 2023 or 2024.

== Gallery ==
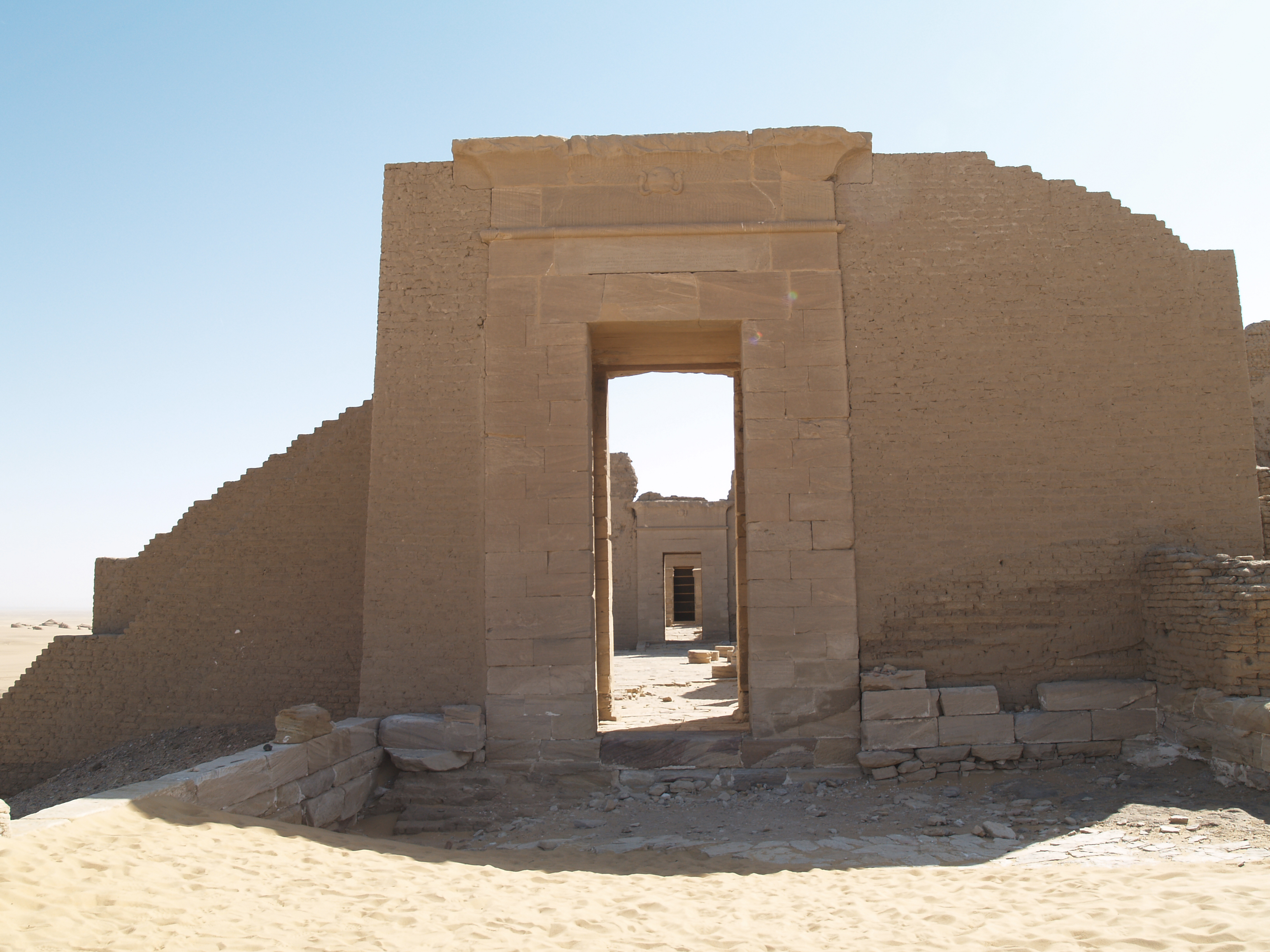
Exterior view of the Temple of Dush

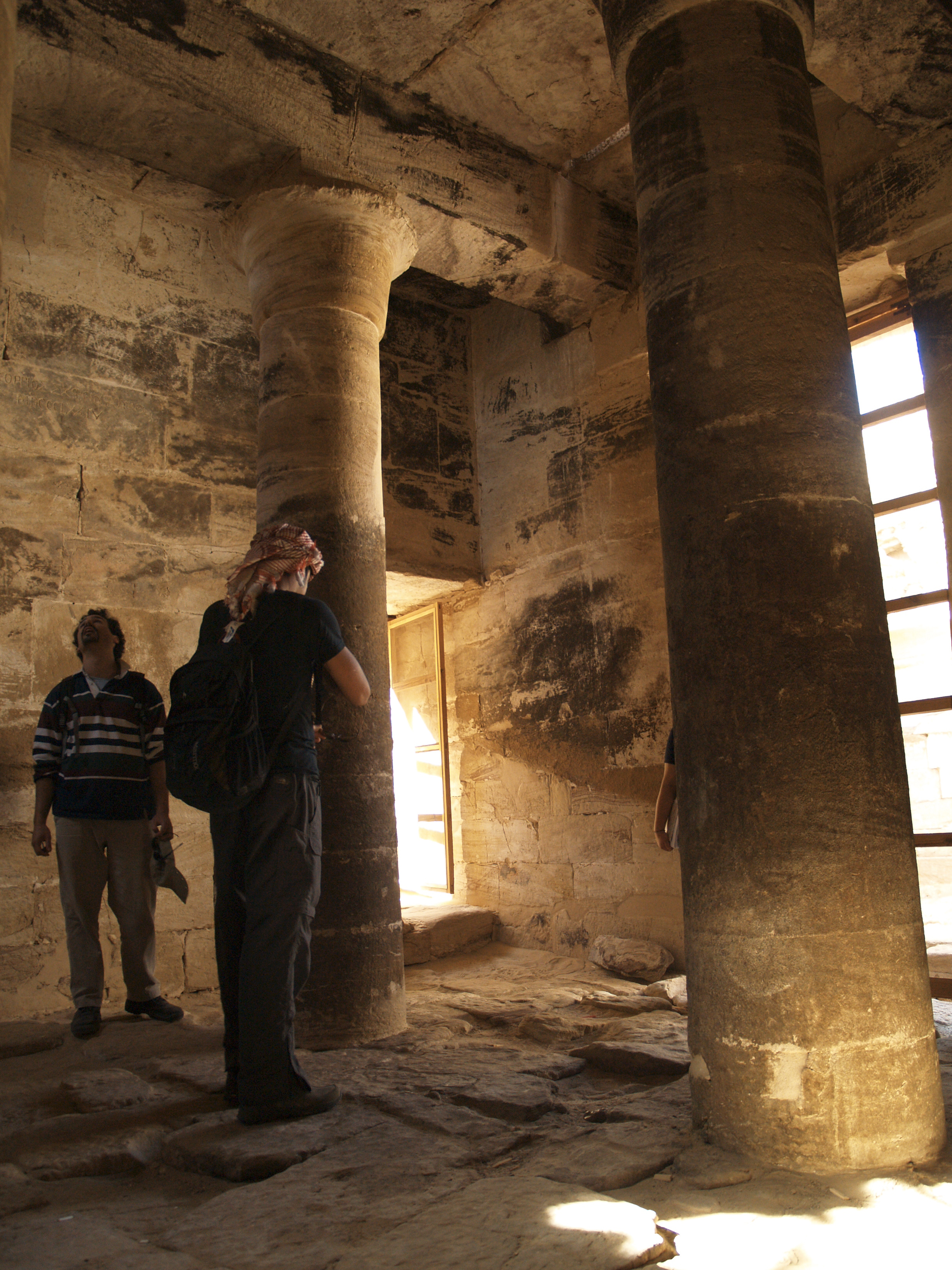
Interior view of the Temple of Dush

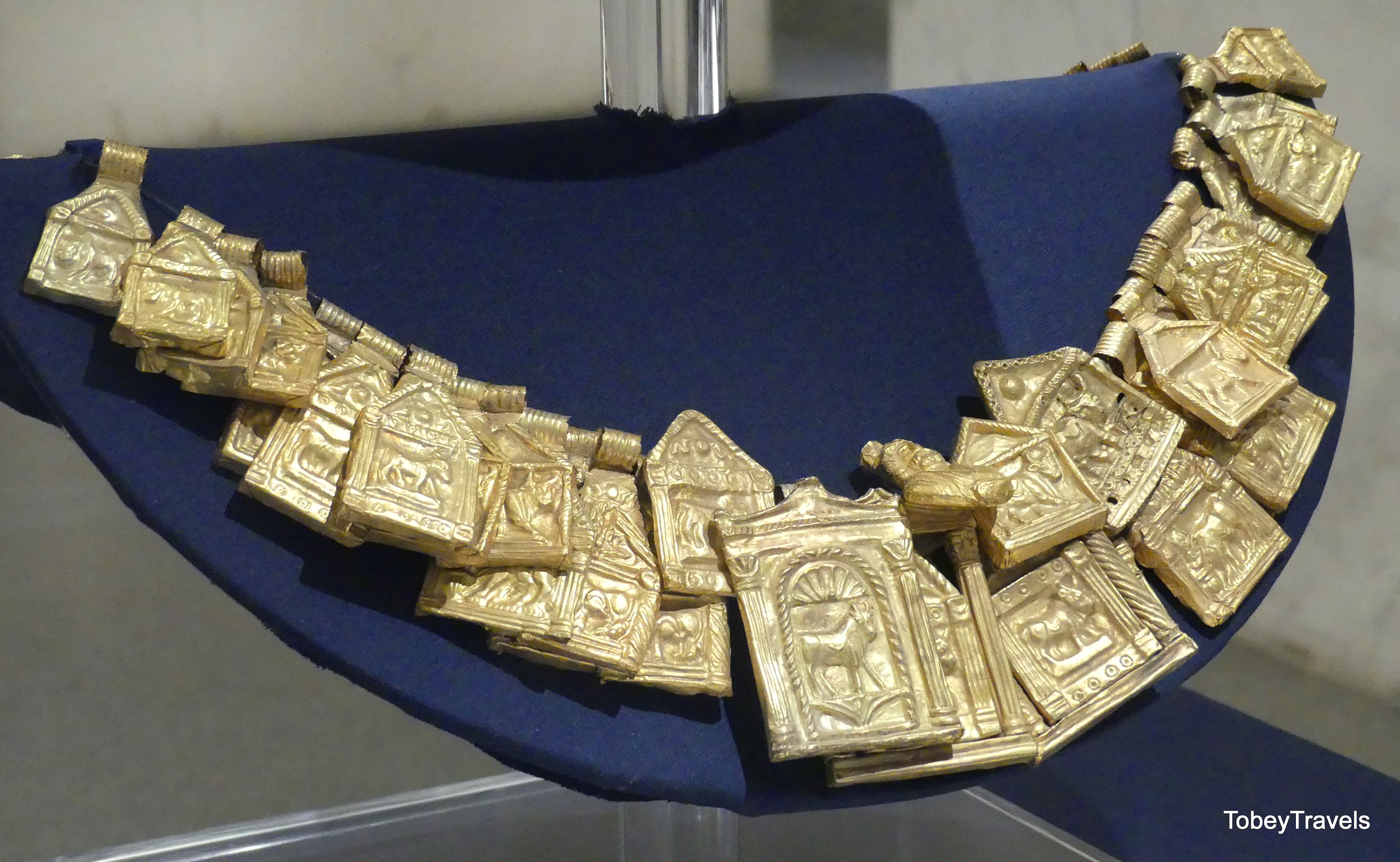
Necklace from the Treasure of Dush

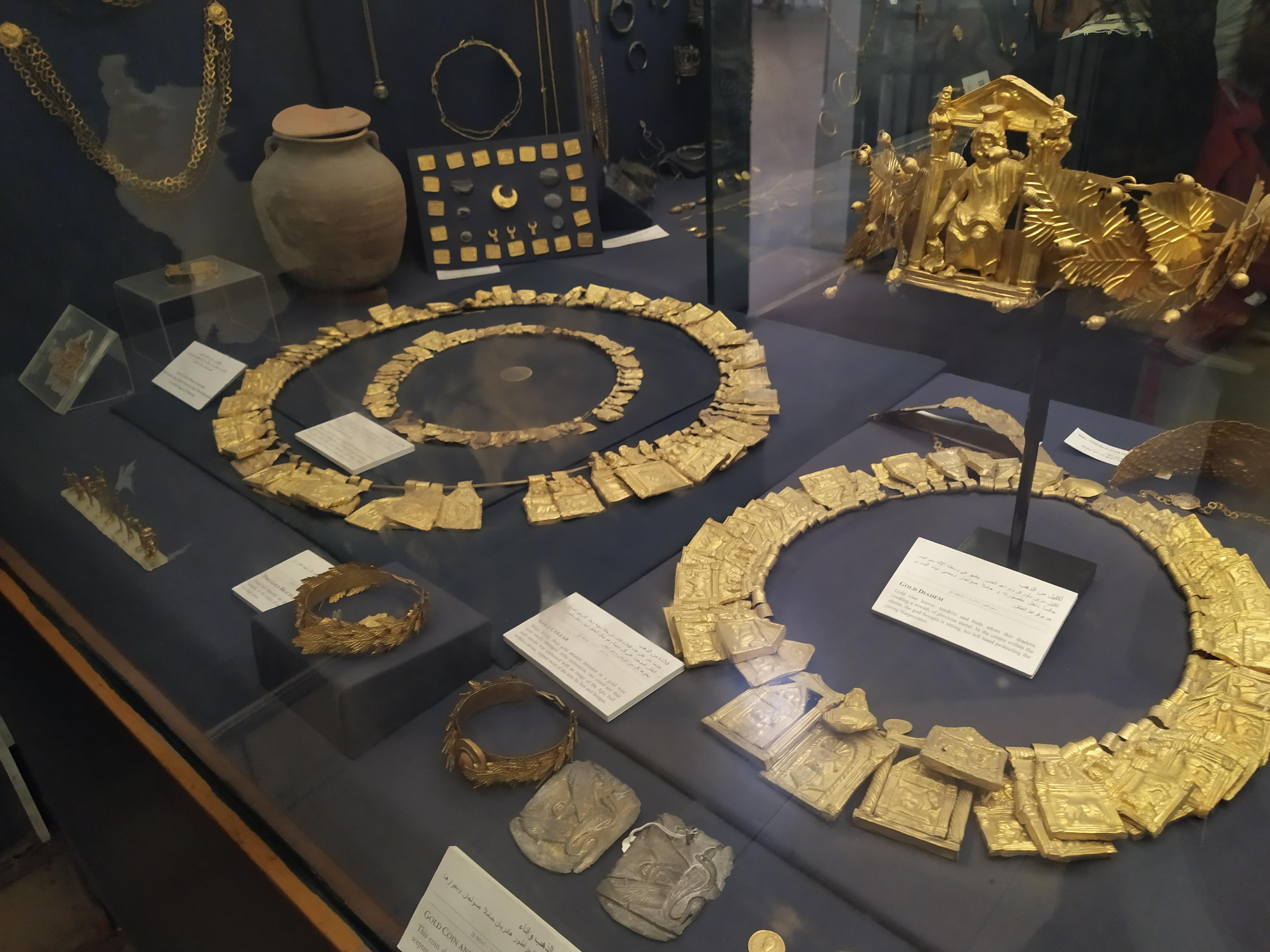
The treasure of Dush from a different view

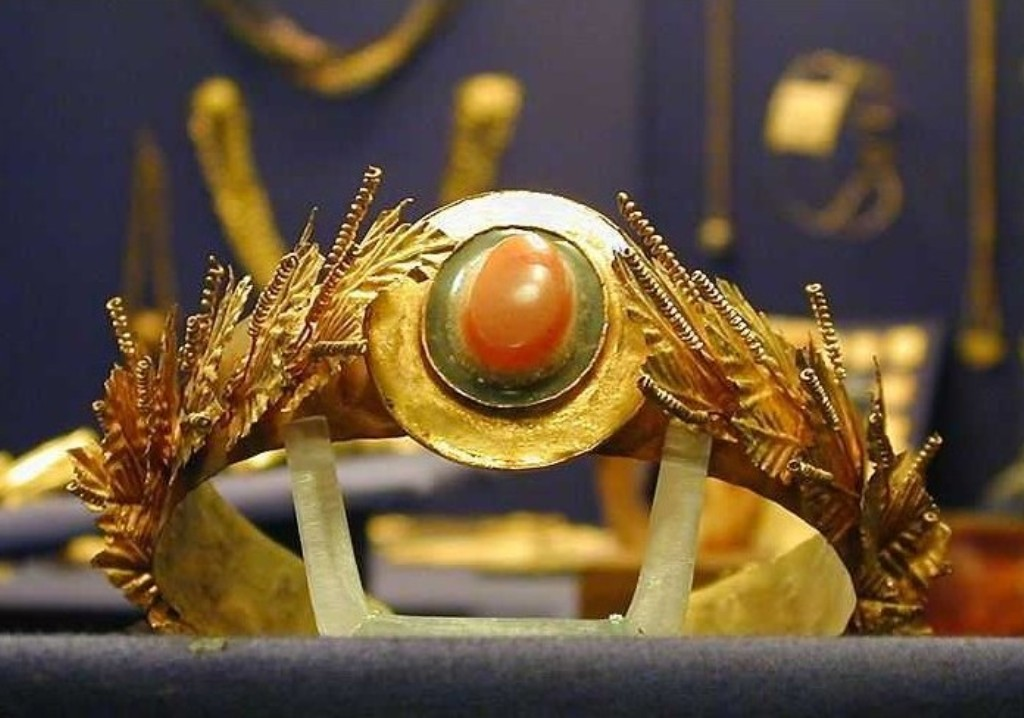
A Beautiful Gold Bracelet with an Orange Agate Medallion from the Treasure of Dush

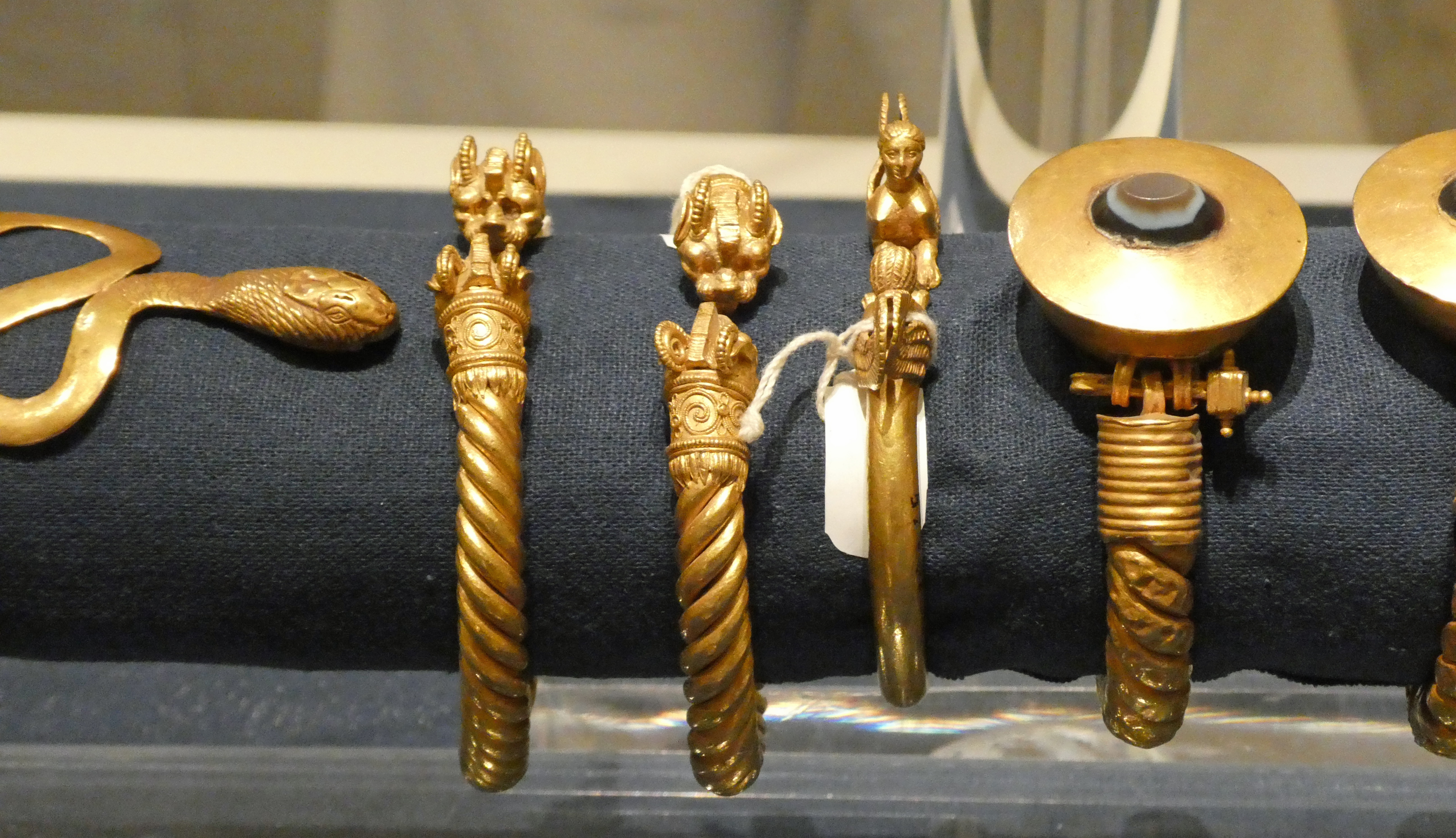
Gold and Icon shaped pagan bracelets from the Treasure of Dush in the NMEC in 2023
