= El Bagawat =

Ancient Christian cemetery in Egypt

Coordinates: 25.486°N 30.555°E

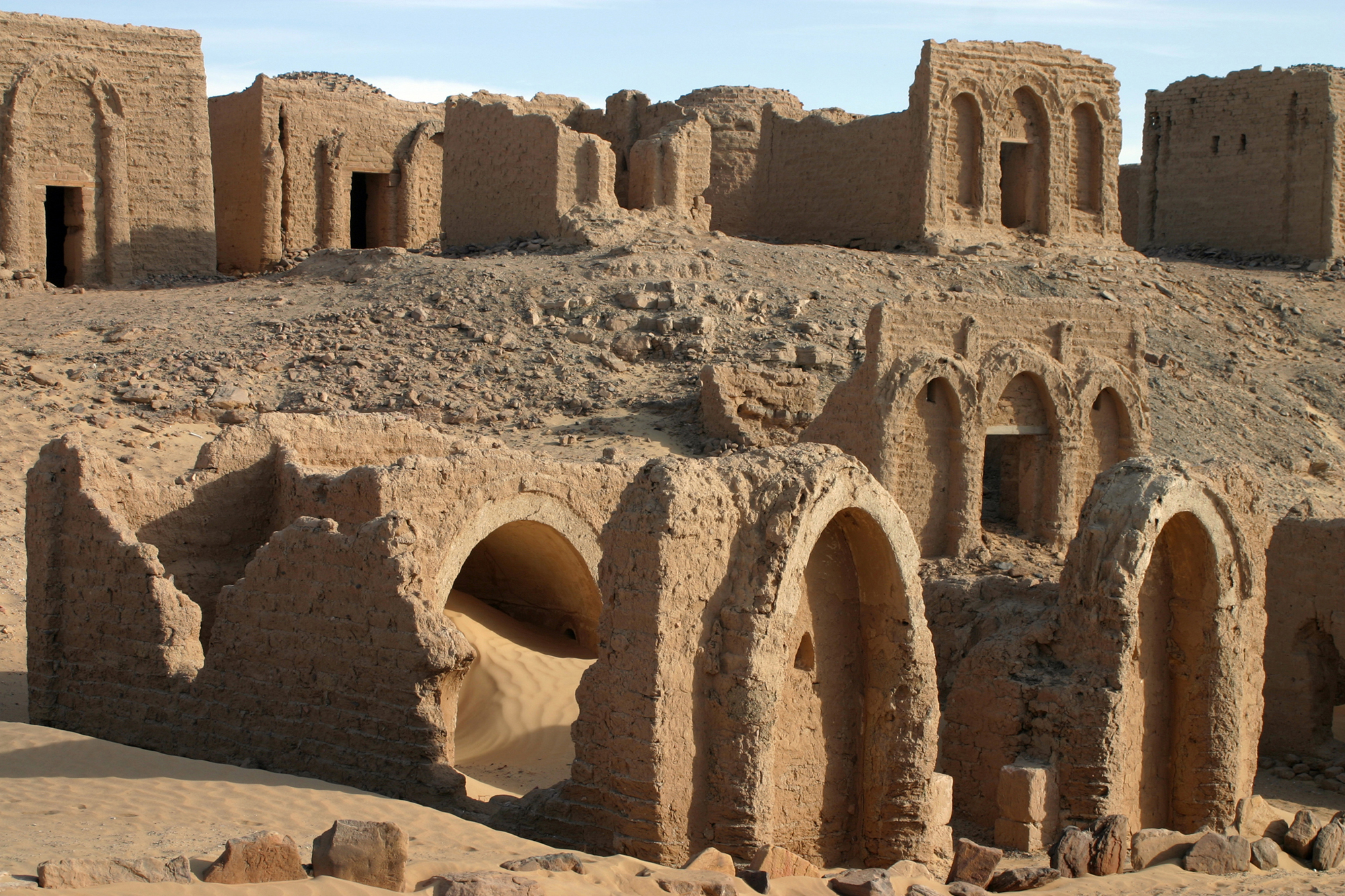
The El Bagawat Christian cemetery at Kharga Oasis

El Bagawat, is an ancient Christian cemetery, and one of the oldest in the world, which functioned at the Kharga Oasis in southern-central Egypt from the 3rd to the 7th century AD. It is one of the earliest and best preserved Christian cemeteries from the ancient world.

== Location ==
The Necropolis of El Bagawat is located in the Western Desert in Kharga Oasis. This is one of the largest oases in Egypt and is 34 meters below sea level.

== History ==
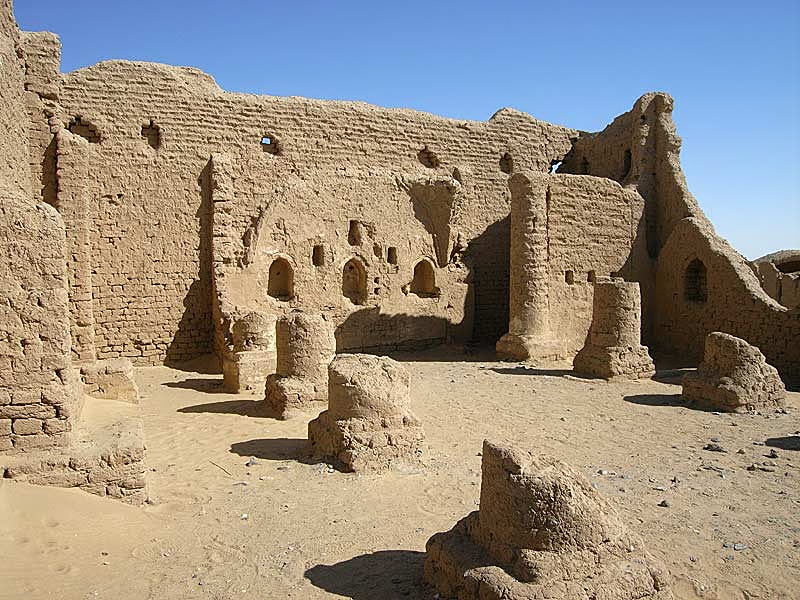
The Church (Chapel 180), Bagawat

The El Bagawat cemetery is reported to be pre-historic and is one of the oldest Christian cemeteries in Egypt. Before Christianity was introduced into Egypt, it was a burial ground used by the non-Christians and later by the Christians. The chapels here are said to belong to both the eras. Coptic frescoes of the 3rd to the 7th century are found on the walls. There are 263 funerary chapels, of which the Chapel of the Exodus (first half of the 4th century) and Chapel of Peace (5th or 6th century) have the best-preserved frescoes, although fresco fragments can also be seen in Chapels 25, 172, 173, 175, and 210.

== Features ==
Dating between the 3rd century before Constantine and the legalization of Christianity up until the 7th century with the Islamic conquest of Egypt, the iconography adorning the chapels at El-Bagawat displays an evolution from the pre-Christian Judeo-Hellenic tradition seen in Jewish sites such as the Synagogue at Dura-Europos towards a unique Pharaonic-Coptic iconography where figures have large and expressive eyes and the integration of specific Egyptian symbolism, such as a peacock which visualizes immortality.

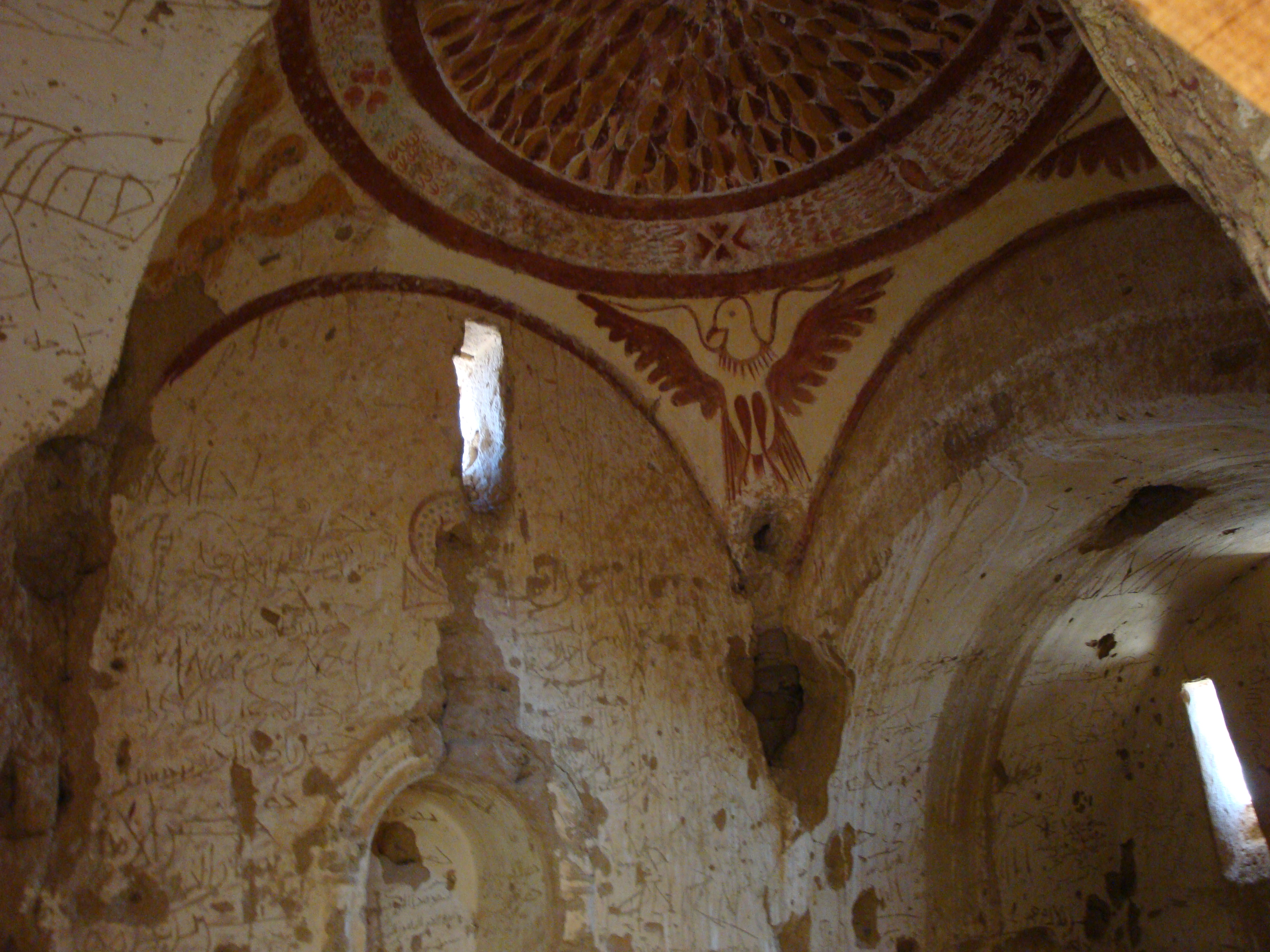
Chapel 25 (Chapel of Exodus), Bagawat

The El Bagawat cemetery has a very large number of tombs in the form of chapel domes. They are built of mud bricks. The tombs have etchings of biblical stories, and also of saints and “personifications of virtues”.

In the Exodus Chapel, there is a depiction of the martyrdom of Isiah; and also of Tekla postured with raised hands, in front of fire being doused by rain. In the Chapel of Peace, the illustrative fresco is of Thekla and Paul.

There are paintings in the cemetery which show the ark of Noah in the form of an "Egyptian barque". Also notable are carved representations of Old Testament scriptures, including Adam and Eve, Daniel in the lion's den, the sacrifice of Abraham, and Jonah swallowed by a fish.

The Church (Chapel 180)

This large chapel displays one of the earliest depictions of The Last Judgment, with Christ enthroned amid angels and the separation of the righteous and the damned, and Christ Pantocrator, portraying Christ as the omnipotent ruler holding the four Gospels. The church contains an altar, a large central dome, and several side chapels.

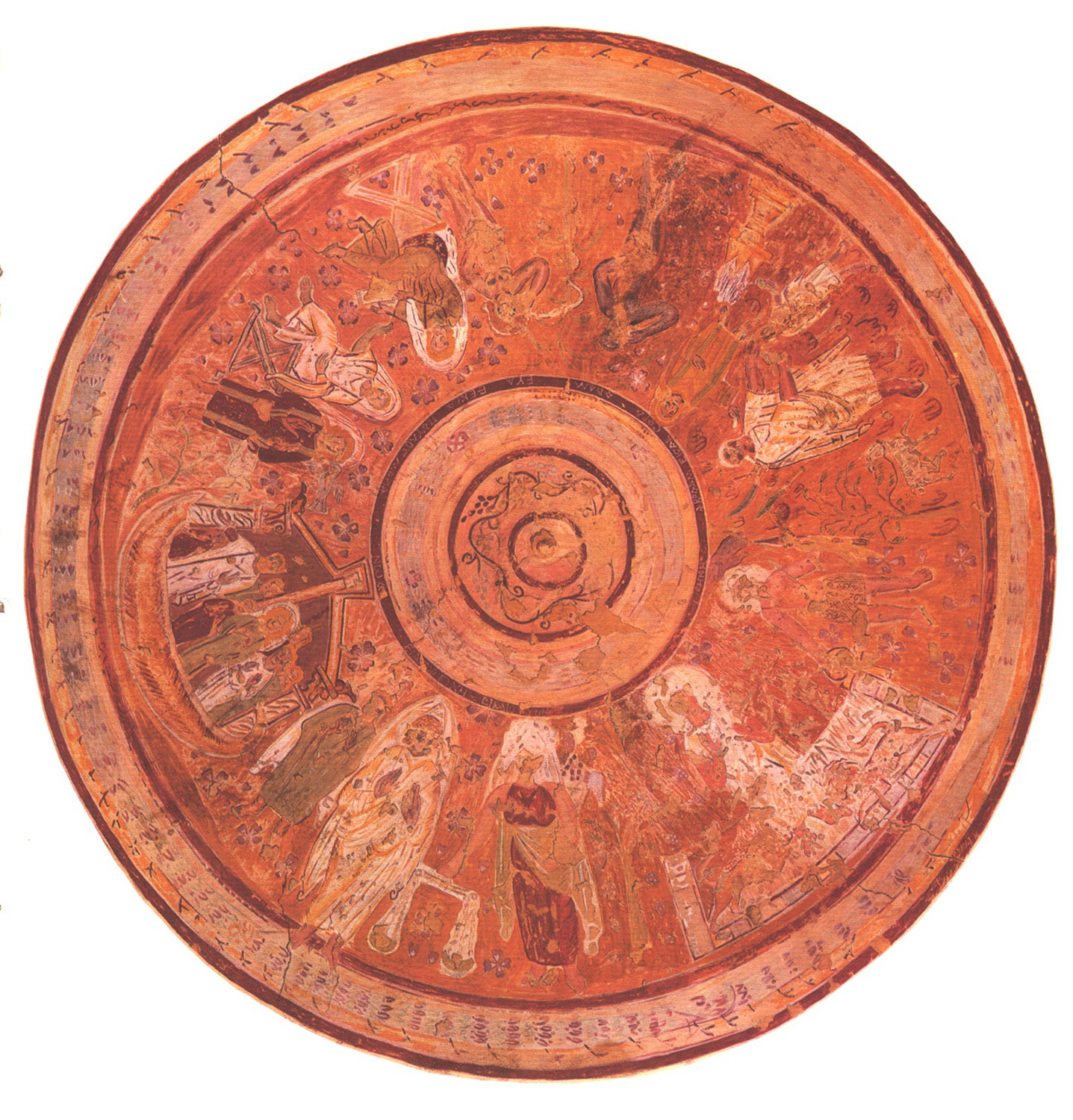
Dome painting in Chapel 28 (Chapel of Peace)

Chapel 25 (Chapel of Exodus)

Considered one of the oldest chapels in the complex, the Chapel of Exodus displays frescoes depicting Moses Parting the Red Sea and The Gathering of Manna. In the Parting of the Red Sea, Moses is shown with arms outstretched, leading the Israelites through the parted waters, which are depicted as towering walls. The Gathering of Manna depicts Israelites collecting manna from heaven, with the figures arranged in a simple, linear composition. There are also scenes of Jonah and the Whale alongside The Annunciation with the angel Gabriel approaching Mary, and symbols such as the Greek Chi-Rho symbol, Coptic crosses and the Dove symbolizing the Holy Spirit.

Chapel 28 (Chapel of Peace)

Some of the most well-preserved and detailed narrative iconography is housed in Chapel 28, including a depiction of the Three Hebrews in the Fiery Furnace and Daniel in the Lions’ Den and various saints from the Old and New Testament.

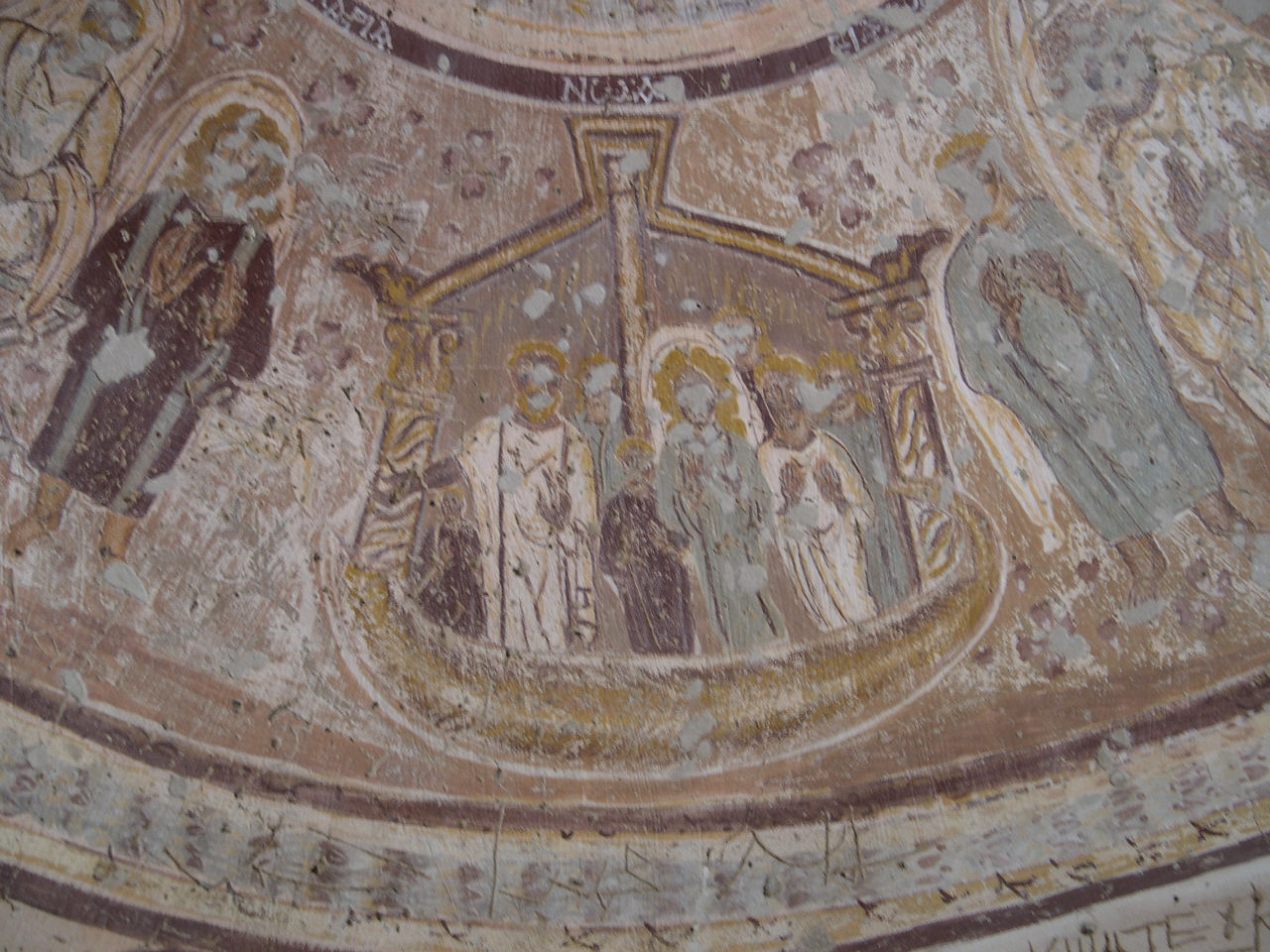
Chapel 28 (Chapel of Peace)

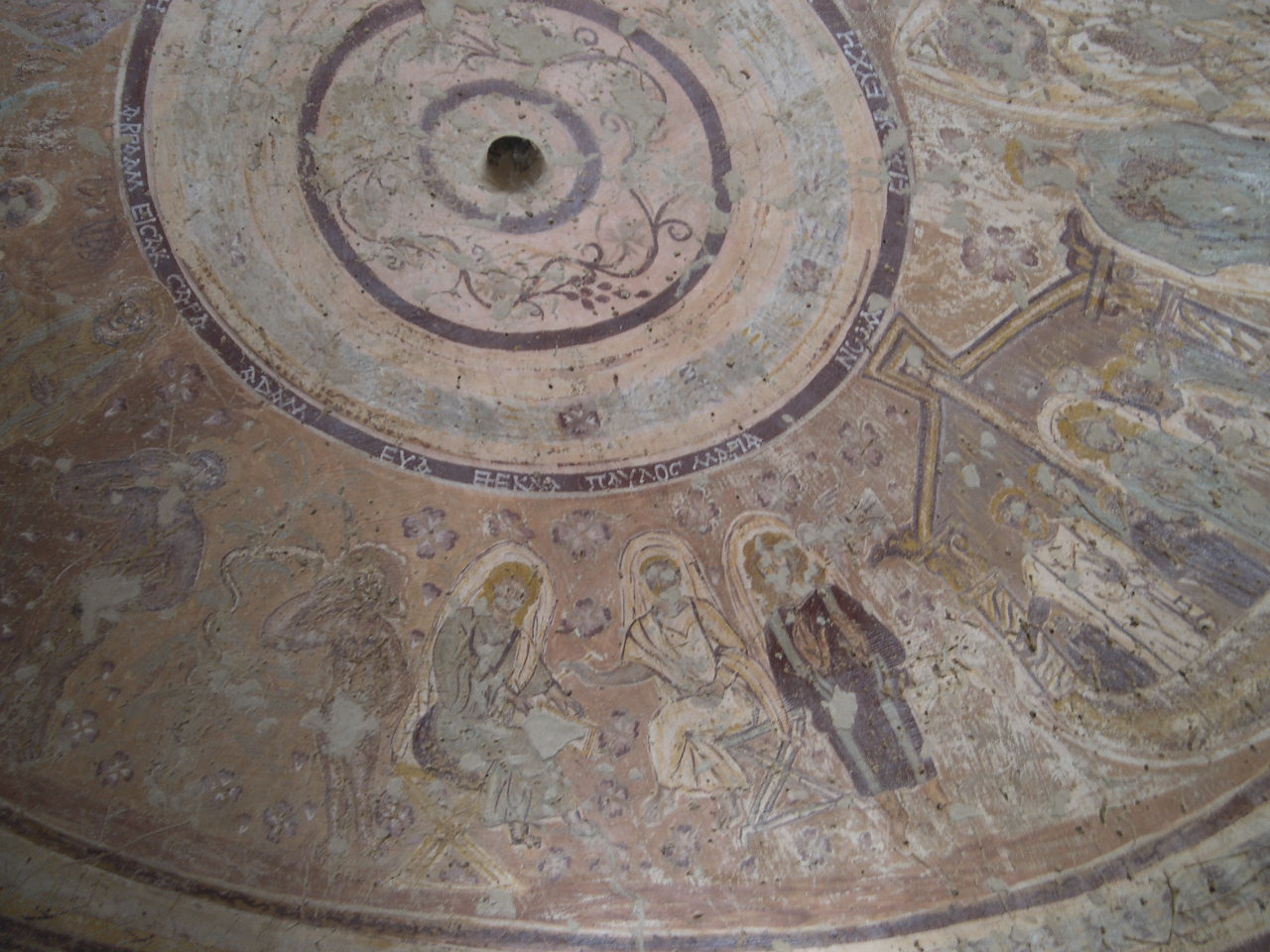
Interior view of Chapel 28

Chapel 175

Depictions of Daniel in the Lions’ Den and geometric patterns. Daniel is depicted standing prayerfully among stylized lions against a minimalist backdrop. Other symbols such as the vine motif are also present.

Chapel 181

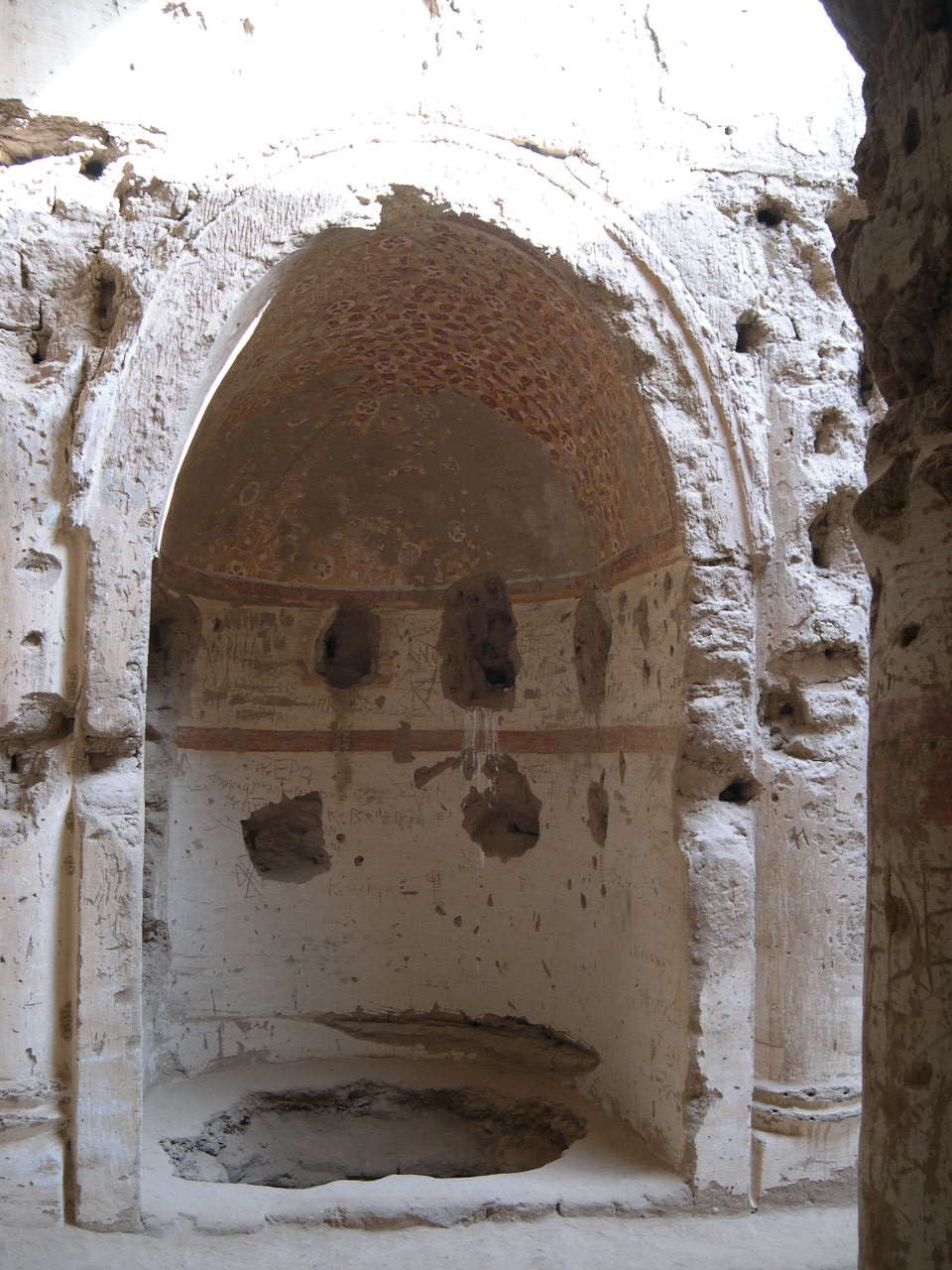
Chapel 23 Dome & baptistry

Prominent frescoes of Noah’s Ark, where Noah is depicted inside the ark with pairs of animals. Noah is drawn within a box-like ark surrounded by paired animals, including clearly identifiable species such as lions and birds.

Chapel 210

A fresco of the Three Hebrews in the Fiery Furnace from the Book of Daniel, accompanied by an angelic figure symbolizing divine protection.

Chapel 23

Contains images of Moses Striking the Rock and The Good Shepherd. Christ is depicted carrying a lamb amidst his flock.

Chapel 9

Contains frescoes of The Baptism of Christ and The Miracle of the Loaves and Fishes. The compositions are simple, with frontal, hieratic figures, and sparse background details.

Chapel 94

Includes iconography of The Transfiguration and The Ascension as well as a vine motif, which is found in many of the chapels.
